This article is a list of Christmas episodes of regular United States television series.

Drama

Crime drama/mystery

 21 Jump Street: "Christmas in Saigon" (Season 2, Episode 11) (1987)
 Alias: "Spirit" (Season 1, Episode 10) (2001)
 All Rise: "The Joy of Oz" (Season 1, Episode 11) (2019)
 The Avengers: "Too Many Christmas Trees" (Season 4, Episode 13) (1965)
 Buddy Faro: "Done Away in a Manger" (Season 1, Episode 10) (1998)
 CHiPs: "Christmas Watch" (Season 3, Episode 15) (1979)
 City Detective: "Christmas Pardon" (Season 1, Episode 3) (1953)
 Crossing Jordan: "Blue Christmas" (Season 1, Episode 10) (2001)
 Delvecchio: APB: Santa Claus (Season 1, Episode 11) (1976)
 The Equalizer: "Christmas Presence" (Season 3, Episode 11) (1987)
 Evil: "7 Swans a Singin" (Season 3, Episode 11) (2019)
 Father Dowling Mysteries: "The Christmas Mystery" (Season 3, Episode 10) (1990)
 The F.B.I.: "Dark Christmas" (Season 8, Episode 15) (1972)
 Forever: "Skinny Dipper" (Season 1, Episode 11) (2014)
 Hardcastle & McCormick: "Hate the Picture, Love the Frame" (Season 2, Episode 10) (1984)
 Hawkeye (2021)
 Highway Patrol: "Christmas Story" (Season 1, Episode 9) (1956)
 Hill Street Blues: "Santaclaustrophobia" (Season 3, Episode 12) (1982)
 Houston Knights: "Somebody to Love" (Season 2, Episode 10) (1987)
 In the Heat of the Night: "Blessings" (Season 4, Episode 13) (1990)
 Kojak: "How Cruel the Frost, How Bright the Stars" (Season 3, Episode 15) (1975)
 Kraft Suspense Theatre: "Are There Any More Out There Like You?" (Season 1, Episode 5) (1963)
 Kung Fu: The Legend Continues: "A Shaolin Christmas" (Season 4, Episode 21) (1996)
 Law & Order: Organized Crime: "The Christmas Episode" (Season 2, Episode 9) (2021)
 Law & Order: Special Victims Unit: "Presumed Guilty" (Season 14, Episode 10) (2013)
 Lie to Me: "Secret Santa" (Season 2, Episode 8) (2010)
 Martial Law: "Sammo Claus" (Season 2, Episode 10) (1999)
 McCloud: "'Twas the Fight Before Christmas" (Season 7, Episode 2) (1976)
 The Mentalist: "Jolly Red Elf" (Season 3, Episode 10) (2010)
 The Mod Squad: "Kristie" (Season 5, Episode 15) (1972)
 Murder, She Wrote: "A Christmas Secret" (Season 9, Episode 9) (1992)
 Miss Fisher's Murder Mysteries: "Murder Under the Mistletoe" (Season 2, Episode 13) (2013)
 Naked City: "And a Merry Christmas to the Force on Patrol" (Season 1, Episode 13) (1958)
 Nash Bridges: "25 Hours of Christmas" (Season 2, Episode 12) (1996)
 A Nero Wolfe Mystery: "Christmas Party" (Season 1, Episode 11) (2001)
 NYPD Blue: "From Hare to Eternity" (Season 1, Episode 11) (1993)
 Over My Dead Body: "Carrie Christmas and a Nappie New Year" (Season 1, Episode 8) (1990)
 Public Defender: "Socrates" (Season 2, Episode 16) (1954)
 Police Woman: "Merry Christmas, Waldo" (Season 4, Episode 7) (1977)
 Prodigal Son: "Silent Night" (Season 1, Episode 10) (2019)
 Racket Squad: "The Christmas Caper" (Season 3, Episode 15) (1952)
 Remington Steele: "Dancer, Prancer, Donner and Steele" (Season 4, Episode 9) (1985)
 Riptide: "Home for Christmas" (Season 3, Episode 9) (1985)
 The Rogues: "Mr. White's Christmas" (Season 1, Episode 29) (1965)
 The Rookies: "Blue Christmas" (Season 3, Episode 13) (1974)
 Simon & Simon: "Yes, Virginia, There Is a Liberace" (Season 4, Episode 13) (1984)
 The Sopranos: "...To Save Us All From Satan's Power" (Season 3, Episode 10) (2001)
 Spenser: For Hire: "The Hopes and Fears" (Season 2, Episode 10) (1986)
 Starsky & Hutch: "Little Girl Lost" (Season 2, Episode 13) (1976)
 Station 19: "All I Want For Christmas is You" (Season 5, Episode 8) (2021)
 Sue Thomas: F.B.Eye: "Silent Night" (Season 1, Episode 9) (2002)
 S.W.A.T. (1975 TV series): "Silent Night, Deadly Night" (Season 2, Episode 15) (1975)
 S.W.A.T. (2017 TV series): "Miracle" (Season 1, Episode 8) (2017)
 T.J. Hooker: "Slay Ride" (Season 3, Episode 12) (1983)
 The Untouchables: "The Night They Shot Santa Claus" (Season 4, Episode 1) (1962)
 Vega$: "Christmas Story" (Season 3, Episode 8) (1980)
 The Wire: "Final Grades" (Season 4, Episode 13) (2006)
 Wiseguy: "Aria for Don Aiuppo" (Season 2, Episode 5) (1988)

9-1-1
 9-1-1: "Merry Ex-Mas" (Season 2, Episode 10) (2018)
 9-1-1: "Christmas Spirit" (Season 3, Episode 10) (2019)
 9-1-1: "Wrapped in Red" (Season 5, Episode 10)  (2021)

Adam-12
 Adam-12: "Log 122: "Christmas—The Yellow Dump Truck" (Season 1, Episode 13) (1968)
 Adam-12: "Log 46: Pilgrimage" (Season 3, Episode 11) (1970)
 Adam-12: "Christmas" (Season 7, Episode 11) (1974)

Alfred Hitchcock Presents
 Alfred Hitchcock Presents: "Santa Claus and the Tenth Avenue Kid" (Season 1, Episode 12) (1955)
 Alfred Hitchcock Presents: "Back for Christmas" (Season 1 Episode 23) (1956)
 Alfred Hitchcock Presents: "The Festive Season" (Season 3, Episode 31) (1958)
 Alfred Hitchcock Presents: "Together" (Season 3, Episode 15) (1958)

Bones
 Bones: "The Man in the Fallout Shelter" (Season 1, Episode 9) (2005)
 Bones: "Santa in the Slush" (Season 3, Episode 9) (2007)
 Bones: "The Goop on the Girl" (Season 5, Episode 10) (2009)

Aquarius
 Aquarius:  "Why?" (Season 1, Episode 9) (2015)
 Aquarius:  "It's Alright Ma (I'm Only Bleeding)" (Season 1, Episode 10) (2015)

Bull
 Bull: "Home For The Holidays" (Season 2, Episode 10) (2017)
 Bull: "Imminent Danger" (Season 4, Episode 10) (2019)
 Bull: "The Ex Factor" (Season 5, Episode 4) (2020)

Cagney & Lacey
 Cagney & Lacey: "I'll Be Home for Christmas" (Season 2, Episode 9) (1982)
 Cagney & Lacey: "Play It Again, Santa" (Season 5, Episode 11) (1985)

Castle
 Castle: "Secret Santa" (Season 5, Episode 9) (2012)
 Castle: "Bad Santa" (Season 7, Episode 10) (2014)

The Closer
 The Closer: "Next of Kin Parts 1 and 2" (Season 3, Episode 14-15) (2007)
 The Closer: "Living Proof Parts 1 and 2" (Season 6, Episode 13-14) (2010)
 The Closer: "You Have the Right to Remain Jolly" (Season 7, Episode 12) (2011)
 The Closer: "Relative Matters" (Season 7, Episode 13) (2011)

CSI
 CSI: NY: "Silent Night" (Season 3, Episode 12) (2006)
 CSI: NY: "Second Chances" (Season 6, Episode 11) (2009)
 CSI: NY: "Shop Till You Drop" (Season 7, Episode 10) (2010)
 CSI: Crime Scene Investigation: "The Lost Reindeer" (Season 14, Episode 11) (2013)

Diagnosis: Murder
 Diagnosis: Murder: "Murder in the Family" (Season 4, Episode 11) (1996)
 Diagnosis: Murder: "Santa Claude" (Season 7, Episode 10) (1999)

The District
 The District: "The Santa Wars" (Season 1, Episode 10) (2000)
 The District: "Small Packages" (Season 3, Episode 10) (2002)

Dragnet
 Dragnet: "The Big .22 Rifle for Christmas" (Season 2, Episode 7) (1952)
 Dragnet: "The Big Little Jesus" (Season 3, Episode 17) (1953)
 Dragnet: "The Christmas Story" (Season 2, Episode 15) (1967)

Hart to Hart
 Hart to Hart: "'Tis the Season to Be Murdered" (Season 2, Episode 5) (1980)
 Hart to Hart: "Hartbreak Kid" (Season 3, Episode 9) (1981)
 Hart to Hart: "A Christmas Hart" (Season 4, Episode 10) (1982)
 Hart to Hart: "Trust Your Hart" (Season 5, Episode 11) (1983)

Hawaii Five-0
 Hawaii Five-0: "Hana 'a'a Makehewa" (Season 1, Episode 12) (2010)
 Hawaii Five-0: "Kahu" (Season 3, Episode 11) (2012)
 Hawaii Five-0: "Pukana" (Season 4, Episode 11) (2013)
 Hawaii Five-0: "Ke Koho Mamao Aku" (Season 5, Episode 9) (2014)
 Hawaii Five-0: "Oni Kalalea Ke Ku a Ka La'au Loa" (Season 8, Episode 11) (2017)

Homicide: Life on the Street
 Homicide: Life on the Street: "All Through the House" (Season 3, Episode 8) (1994)
 Homicide: Life on the Street: "All is Bright" (Season 6, Episode 8) (1997)

How to Get Away with Murder
 How to Get Away with Murder: "Best Christmas Ever" (Season 1, Episode 11) (2015)
 How to Get Away with Murder: "Where Are Your Parents?" (Season 5, Episode 13) (2019)

Jake and the Fatman
 Jake and the Fatman: Have Yourself a Merry Little Christmas (Season 1, Episode 12) (1987)
 Jake and the Fatman: What Child Is This? (Season 3, Episode 11) (1989)

Magnum, P.I.
 Magnum, P.I.: Thank Heaven for Little Girls (and Big Ones Too) (Season 1, Episode 4) (1980)
 Magnum, P.I.: Operation: Silent Night (Season 4, Episode 10) (1983)

Major Crimes
 Major Crimes: Curve Ball (2013)
 Major Crimes: Risk Assessment (2013)
 Major Crimes: Chain Reaction (2014)
 Major Crimes: Penalty Phase (2015)

Matlock
 Matlock: Santa Claus (1986)
 Matlock: The Gift (1987)
 Matlock: The Scrooge (1989)

Monk
 Monk: "Mr. Monk and the Secret Santa" (Season 4, Episode 9) (2005)
 Monk: "Mr. Monk Meets His Dad" (Season 5, Episode 9) (2006)
 Monk: "Mr. Monk and the Man Who Shot Santa Claus" (Season 6, Episode 10) (2007)
 Monk: "Mr. Monk and the Miracle" (Season 7, Episode 9) (2008)
 Monk: "Mr. Monk and the End" (Season 8, Episodes 15 & 16) (2009)

NCIS
 NCIS: "Silent Night" (Season 6, Episode 11) (2008)
 NCIS: "Faith" (Season 7, Episode 10) (2009)
 NCIS: "False Witness" (Season 8, Episode 10) (2010)
 NCIS: "Newborn King" (Season 9, Episode 11) (2011)
 NCIS: "You Better Watch Out" (Season 10, Episode 10) (2012)
 NCIS: "Homesick" (Season 11, Episode 11) (2013)
 NCIS: "House Rules" (Season 12, Episode 10) (2014)
 NCIS: "Spinning Wheel" (Season 13, Episode 11) (2015)
 NCIS: "The Tie That Binds" (Season 14, Episode 10) (2016)
 NCIS: "Double Down" (Season 15, Episode 10) (2017)
 NCIS: "What Child Is This" (Season 16, Episode 10) (2018)
 NCIS: "The North Pole" (Season 17, Episode 10) (2019)
 NCIS: Los Angeles: "Brimstone" (Season 1, Episode 10) (2009)
 NCIS: Los Angeles: "Disorder" (Season 2, Episode 11) (2010)
 NCIS: Los Angeles: "Higher Power" (Season 3, Episode 11) (2011)
 NCIS: Los Angeles: "Free Ride" (Season 4, Episode 10) (2012)
 NCIS: Los Angeles: "Merry Evasion" (Season 5, Episode 12) (2013)
 NCIS: Los Angeles: "Humbug" ( Season 6, Episode 11) (2014)
 NCIS: Los Angeles: "Cancel Christmas" (Season 7, Episode 11) (2015)
 NCIS: Los Angeles: "Tidings We Bring" (Season 8, Episode 11) (2016)
 NCIS: Los Angeles: "All Is Bright" (Season 9, Episode 11) (2017)
 NCIS: Los Angeles: "Joyride" (Season 10, Episode 11) (2018)
 NCIS: Los Angeles: "Answers" (Season 11, Episode 11) (2019)
 NCIS: New Orleans: "Stolen Valor" (Season 1, Episode 10) (2014)
 NCIS: New Orleans: "Blue Christmas" (Season 2, Episode 11) (2015)

Profiler
 Profiler: "Old Acquaintance" (Season 2, Episode 6) (1997)
 Profiler: "Home for the Homicide" (Season 3, Episode 8) (1998)
 Profiler: "Original Sin" (Season 4, Episode 7) (1999)

Psych
 Psych: "Gus's Dad May Have Killed an Old Guy" (Season 2, Episode 10) (2007)
 Psych: "Christmas Joy" (Season 3, Episode 9) (2008)
 Psych: "The Polarizing Express" (Season 5, Episode 14) (2010)

Scarecrow and Mrs. King
 Scarecrow and Mrs. King: "The Long Christmas Eve" (Season 1, Episode 10) (1983)
 Scarecrow and Mrs. King: "Santa's Got a Brand New Bag" (Season 4, Episode 11) (1986)

Suspense
 Suspense: "Dancing Dan's Christmas" (Season 3, Episode 17) (1950)
 Suspense: "The Gift of Fear" (Season 6, Episode 17) (1953)

Walker, Texas Ranger
 Walker, Texas Ranger: "The Covenant" (Season 4, Episode 11) (1995)
 Walker, Texas Ranger: "A Ranger's Christmas" (Season 5, Episode 13) (1996)
 Walker, Texas Ranger: "A Matter of Faith" (Season 8, Episode 12) (1999)

Without a Trace
 Without a Trace: "Malone v. Malone" (Season 3, Episode 10) (2004)
 Without a Trace: "Claus and Effect" (Season 6, Episode 10) (2007)

Medical drama

Supernatural/Sci-Fi/Fantasy/Horror

Teen drama
{{columns-list|colwidth=40em|
 Boston Public: "Chapter Twenty-Nine" (Season 2, Episode 7) (2001)
 The Carrie Diaries: "The Second Time Around" (Season 2, Episode 8) (2013)
 Chasing Life: "Locks of Love" (Season 1, Episode 11) (2014)
 Dawson's Creek: "Self Reliance" (Season 4, Episode 10) (2000), "Merry Mayhem" (Season 6, Episode 10) (2002)
 The Fosters: "Christmas Past" (Season 2, Episode 11) (2014)
 My So-Called Life: "So-Called Angels" (Season 2, Episode 15) (1994)
 Pretty Little Liars: "How the 'A' Stole Christmas" (Season 5, Episode 13) (2014)
 Riverdale: "Chapter Twenty-Two: Silent Night, Deadly Night" (Season 2, Episode 9) (2017)
 State of Grace: "Holiday on Ice" (Season 2, Episode 26) (2002)
 Switched at Birth: "Yuletide Fortune Tellers" (Season 3, Episode 22) (2014)
 TV 101: "Home" (Season 1, Episode 4) (1988)

90210
 90210: "Winter Wonderland" (Season 2, Episode 12) (2009)
 90210: "Holiday Madness" (Season 3, Episode 11) (2010)
 90210: "O Holly Night" (Season 4, Episode 12) (2011)
 90210: "The Things We Do for Love" (Season 5, Episode 9) (2012)

Beverly Hills, 90210 / Melrose Place
 Beverly Hills, 90210: "A Walsh Family Christmas" (Season 2, Episode 18) (1991)
 Beverly Hills, 90210: "It's a Totally Happening Life (Season 3, Episode 16) (1992)
 Beverly Hills, 90210: "Somewhere in the World It's Christmas" (Season 4, Episode 15) (1993)
 Beverly Hills, 90210: "Christmas Comes This Time Each Year (Season 5, Episode 15) (1994)
 Beverly Hills, 90210: "Angels We Have Heard on High" (Season 6, Episode 14)  (1995)
 Beverly Hills, 90210: "Gift Wrapped" (Season 7, Episode 13) (1996)
 Beverly Hills, 90210: "Santa Knows" (Season 8, Episode 14) (1997)
 Beverly Hills, 90210: "Marathon Man" (Season 9, Episode 11) (1998)
 Beverly Hills, 90210: "Nine Yolks Whipped Lightly" (Season 10, Episode 11) (1999)
 Melrose Place: "A Melrose Place Christmas" (Season 1, Episode 18) (1992)
 Melrose Place: "Under the Mistletoe" (Season 2, Episode 15) (1993)
 Melrose Place: "Holiday on Ice" (Season 3, Episode 15) (1994)
 Melrose Place: "Oy! to the World" (Season 4, Episode 15) (1995)
 Melrose Place: "Crazy Love" (Season 5, Episode 12) (1996)
 Melrose Place: "A Tree Talks in Melrose" (Season 6, Episode 13) (1997)
 Melrose Place: "The Usual Santas" (Season 7, Episode 19) (1998)

Disney Channel, Disney XD
 A.N.T. Farm:
"SANTa's Little Helpers" (Season 1, Episode 20) (2011)
 "SilANT Night" (Season 3, Episode 15) (2013) 
Adventures in Wonderland: "Christmas In Wonderland" (Season 3, Episode 4) (1992)
 Austin and Ally: 
"Big Dreams & Big Apples" (Season 2 episode 6) (2012)
 "Mix-Ups and Mistletoes" (Season 3, Episode 5) (2013)
"Santas and Surprises" (Season 4, Episode 18) (2015)
 Best Friends Whenever:
 "The Girls of Christmas Past" (Season 1, Episode 13) (2015)
 "The Christmas Curse" (Season 2, Episode 11) (2016)
Bizaardvark:
 "Augh, Humbug!" (Season 1, Episode 17) (2016)
 "A Killer Robot Christmas" (Season 2, Episode 14) (2017)
 "Holiday Video Sketchtacular" (Season 3, Episode 8) (2018)
Bunk'd:
"Secret Santa" (Season 1, Episode 9) (2015)
"How the Griff Stole Christmas" (Season 2, Episode 11) (2016)
"Summer Winter Wonderland" (Season 4, Episode 15) (2019)
"Hauntin' Around the Christmas Tree" (Season 6, Episode 10) (2022)
Coop & Cami Ask the World: 
 "Would You Wrather Get a Moose Angry?" (Season 1, Episode 8) (2018)
 "Would You Wrather Lose Your Presents?" (Season 2, Episode 9) (2019)
Crash & Bernstein: "Merry Crashenfest" (Season 2, Episode 8) (2013)
Disney Fam Jam: "Jolly Holidance" (Season 1, Episode 19) (2020)
Disney’s Magic Bake-Off: Holiday (2021)
 Dog With A Blog:
 "Bark! The Herald Angels Sing" (Season 1, Episode 6) (2012)
 "Twas the Fight Before Christmas" (Season 2, Episode 7) (2013)
 "Stan Steals Christmas" (Season 3, Episode 6) (2014)
Gabby Duran & the Unsittables: "It's Christmas, Gabby Duran!" (Season 1, Episode 8) (2019)
 Good Luck Charlie: 
 Good Luck Charlie, It's Christmas! (2011) 
 "A Duncan Christmas" (Season 3, Episode 21) (2012)
 "Good Luck Jessie: NYC Christmas" (Season 4, Episode 17) (2013)
 Hannah Montana: 
 "Killing Me Softly With His Height" (Season 3, Episode 5) (2008)
 "It's the End of the Jake as We Know It" (Season 4, Episode 5) (2010)
 I Didn't Do It: "Merry Miss Sis" (Season 1, Episode 20) (2014)
 Jessie: 
 "Christmas Story" (Season 1, Episode 8) (2011)
 "Nanny in Miami" (Season 2, Episode 6) (2012)
 "Good Luck Jessie: NYC Christmas" (Season 3, Episode 7) (2013)
 "Jessie's Aloha-Holidays with Parker and Joey" (Season 3, Episode 26) (2014)
 Just Roll with It: 
"Merry Christmas, Mr. Gooch" (Season 1, Episode 18) (2019)
"It's The Most Wonderful Crime of the Year" (Season 2, Episode 12) (2020)
 K.C. Undercover: 
 "Twas the Fight Before Christmas" (Season 1, Episode 27) (2015)
 "Holly Holly Not So Jolly" (Season 2, Episode 22) (2016)
 Kickin' It: "Oh, Christmas Nuts!" (Season 2, Episode 24) (2012)
 Kirby Buckets: "It's A Kirbyful Life!" (Season 2, Episode 8) (2015)
 Lab Rats: 
 "Twas the Mission Before Christmas" (Season 2, Episode 24) (2013)
 "Merry Glitchmas" (Season 3, Episode 20) (2014)
 Liv and Maddie: "Fa-la-la-A-Rooney" (Season 1, Episode 10) (2013)"Joy to-A-Rooney" (Season 3, Episode 9) (2015)"Cali Christmas-A-Rooney" ( Season 4, Episode 6) (2016)
 Lizzie McGuire: 
 "Aaron Carter's Coming to Town" (Season 1, Episode 7) (2001)
 "Xtreme Xmas" (Season 2, Episode 20) (2003)
 Pair of Kings: "Pair of Santas" (Season 2, Episode 16) (2011)
 Phil of the Future: "Christmas Break" (Season 2, Episode 15) (2005)
 Shake It Up: 
 "Jingle It Up" (Season 2, Episode 11) (2011)
 "Merry Merry It Up" (Season 3, Episode 5) (2012)
 So Random!: "Justin Bieber" (Season 1, Episode 18) (2011)
 So Weird: "Fountain" (Season 2, Episode 13) (1999)
 Sonny with a Chance: "A So Random Holiday Special" (Season 2, Episode 22) (2010)
 Sydney to the Max: "How the Syd Stole Christmas" (Season 2, Episode 1) (2019)
 Stuck in the Middle: "Stuck at Christmas - The Movie" (2017)
 The Famous Jett Jackson: "What Money Can't Buy" (Season 2, Episode 14) (1999)
 The Suite Life of Zack & Cody/The Suite Life on Deck: 
 "Christmas at the Tipton" (Season 1, Episode 21) (2005)
 "A London Carol" (Season 3, Episode 15) (2010)
 That's So Raven/Raven's Home: 
 "Escape Claus" (Season 2, Episode 4) (2003)"Bah Humbugged" (Season 3, Episode 16) (2019)"Mad About Yuletide" (Season 4, Episode 7) (2020)"A Country Cousin Christmas" (Season 5, Episode 25)  (2022) 
 The Villains of Valley View: "How the Villains Stole Christmas" (Season 1, Episode 19) (2022)
 Zeke and Luther: "Bro Ho Ho" (Season 2, Episode 26) (2010)

Felicity
 Felicity: "And to All a Good Night" (Season 3, Episode 11) (2000)
 Felicity: "A Perfect Match" (Season 4, Episode 11) (2001)

Good Trouble
 Good Trouble: "Nochebuena" (Season 2, Episode 9) (2019)
 Good Trouble: "A Very Coterie Christmas" (Season 2, Episode 10) (2019)

Gossip Girl
 Gossip Girl: "Roman Holiday" (Season 1, Episode 11) (2007)
 Gossip Girl: "The Townie" (Season 4, Episode 11) (2010)

The O.C.
 The O.C: "The Best Chrismukkah Ever" (Season 1, Episode 13) (2003)
 The O.C: "The Chrismukkah That Almost Wasn't" (Season 2, Episode 6) (2004)
 The O.C: "The Chrismukkah Bar-Mitzvahkkah" (Season 3, Episode 10) (2005)
 The O.C: "The Chrismukk-huh?" (Season 4, Episode 7) (2006)

Nickelodeon
 The Adventures of Pete & Pete: "O' Christmas Pete" (Season 3, Episode 11) (1995)
 The Journey of Allen Strange: "Starwalk" (Season 1, Episode 5) (1997)
 The Naked Brothers Band: "Christmas Special" (Season 3, Episode 5) (2008)
 The Secret World of Alex Mack: "The Gift" (Season 2, Episode 10) (1995)
 The Troop: "The Good, The Bad and the Ickie Doll" (Season 1, Episode 11) (2009)

Party of Five / Time of Your Life
 Party of Five: "Christmas" (Season 3, Episode 13) (1996)
 Party of Five: "S'Wunnerful Life" (Season 4, Episode 11) (1997)
 Party of Five: "One Christmas, to Go" (Season 5, Episode 10)  (1998)
 Time of Your Life: "The Time They Had Not" (Season 1, Episode 7) (1999)

Popular
 Popular: "Fall on Your Knees" (Season 1, Episode 19) (1999)
 Popular: "The Consequences of Falling" (Season 2, Episode 10) (2000)

Power Rangers
 Mighty Morphin Power Rangers: "Alpha's Magical Christmas" (1994)
 Mighty Morphin Power Rangers: "I'm Dreaming of a White Ranger" (Season 3, Episode 16) (1995)
 Power Rangers Zeo: "A Season to Remember" (Season 1, Episode 29) (1996)
 Power Rangers Samurai: "Christmas Together, Friends Forever" (Season 1, Episode 23) (2011)
 Power Rangers Super Samurai: "Stuck on Christmas" (Season 1, Episode 22) (2012)
 Power Rangers Megaforce: "The Robo Knight Before Christmas" (Season 1, Episode 22) (2013)
 Power Rangers Dino Charge: "Race to Rescue Christmas'" (Season 1, Episode 22) (2015)
 Power Rangers Dino Supercharge: "Here Comes Heximas" (Season 2, Episode 22) (2016)
 Power Rangers Ninja Steel: "Past, Presents, And Future" (Season 1, Episode 22) (2017)
 Power Rangers Super Ninja Steel: "The Poisy Show" (Season 1, Episode 22) (2018)
 Power Rangers Beast Morphers: Scrozzle's Revenge" (Season 1, Episode 22) (2019)
 Power Rangers Dino Fury: "Secret Santa" (Season 1, Episode 22) (2021)

Veronica Mars
 Veronica Mars: "An Echolls Family Christmas" (Season 1, Episode 10) (2004)
 Veronica Mars: "One Angry Veronica" (Season 2, Episode 10) (2005)

}}

Westerns

Drama anthology series

Other dramas

Comedy-drama

Sitcoms

 100 Deeds for Eddie McDowd: "A Very Canine Christmas" (Season 1, Episode 20) (2000)
 3rd Rock from the Sun (Season 2, Episode 12): "Jolly Old St. Dick" (1996)
 9 to 5: "Blue Christmas" (Season 4, Episode 15) (1986)
 Abbott Elementary: "Holiday Hookah" (Season 2, Episode 10) (2022)
 About a Boy (Season 2, Episode 8): "About a Christmas Carol" (2014)
 Acapulco: "The Most Wonderful Time of the Year" (Season 1, Episode 9) (2021)
 Accidentally on Purpose: "It Happened One Christmas" (Season 1, Episode 11) (2009)
 The Addams Family: "Christmas with the Addams Family" (Season 2, Episode 15) (1965)
 Aggretsuko: "We Wish You a Metal Christmas" (Season 1, Episode 11) (2018)
 Aliens in America: "Church" (Season 1, Episode 10) (2007)
 All That:  "Run-DMC" (Season 2, Episode 10) (1995)
  "1134" (Season 1, Episode 34) (2020)
 The Amos 'n Andy Show: "The Christmas Story" (Season 2, Episode 13) (1952)
 The Andy Griffith Show: "A Christmas Story" (Season 1, Episode 11) (1960)
 Anything But Love: "Salmonella is Coming to Town" (Season 4, Episode 10) (1991)
 Big Time Rush: "Big Time Christmas" (Season 2, Episodes 8-9) (2010)
 Bucket & Skinner's Epic Adventures: "Epic Christmas" (Season 1, Episode 16) (2012)
 Baby Talk: "Away in a Manger" (Season 2, Episode 11) (1991)
 Bachelor Father: "Deck the Halls" (Season 5, Episode 13) (1961)
 Back in the Game: "I'll Slide Home for Christmas" (Season 1, Episode 10) (2013)
 Better with You: "Better with Christmas Crap" (Season 1, Episode 10) (2010)
 The Betty Hutton Show: "The Christmas Story" (Season 1, Episode 12) (1959)
 The Big Show Show: "The Big Christmas" (Season 1, Episode 10) (2020)
 The Bill Cosby Show: "A Christmas Ballad" (Season 1, Episode 13) (1969)
 The Bill Engvall Show: "The Night Before Christmas" (Season 2, Episode 11) (2008)
 The Bing Crosby Show: "The Christmas Show" (Season 1, Episode 14) (1964)
 Bless the Harts: "Miracle on Culpepper Slims Boulevard" (Season 1, Episode 8) (December 15, 2019)
 Bless This House: "Misery on 34th Street" (Season 1, Episode 13) (1995)
 Bless This Mess: "Goose Glazing Time" (Season 2, Episode 9) (2019)
 Blockbuster: "Sh*t Storm" (Season 1, Episode 10) (2022)
 Blossom: "It's a Marginal Life" (Season 2, Episode 13) (1991)
 BoJack Horseman: "Sabrina's Christmas Wish" (2014)
 Boston Common: "Arts and Craftiness" (Season 2, Episode 10) (1996)
 The Boys Are Back: "The Christmas Show" (Season 1, Episode 11) (1994)
 Bridget Loves Bernie: "'Tis the Season" (Season 1, Episode 14) (1972)
 Brotherly Love: "A Roman Holiday" (Season 1, Episode 11) (1995)
 The Brothers: "The Christmas Story" (Season 1, Episode 13) (1956)
 Brothers (1984 TV series): "Happy Birthday Mel" (Season 1, Episode 14) (1984)
 Brothers (2009 TV series): "Christmas" (Season 1, Episode 11) (2009)
 Buffalo Bill: "Have Yourself a Very Degrading Christmas" (Season 2, Episode 13) (1984)
 Café Americain: "Deck the Halls with Boughs of Holly" (Season 1, Episode 12) (1993)
 Call Me Kat: "Call Me Chrismukkah" (Season 3, Episode 9) (2022)
 Camp Wilder: "A Close Shave" (Season 1, Episode 12) (1992)
 Car 54, Where Are You?: "Christmas at the 53rd" (Season 1, Episode 15) (1961)
 Carol's Second Act: "Merry December 19" (Season 1, Episode 10) (2019)
 The Cavanaughs: "Yes, Virginia, There Is a Pop" (Season 1, Episode 4) (1986)
 Charlie & Co.: "Silent Knight" (Season 1, Episode 12) (1985)
 The Charmings: "Yes, Lilian, There Really Is a Santa Claus" (Season 2, Episode 10) (1987)
 Chico and the Man: "The Proposal" (Season 4, Episode 7) (1977)
 Cinema Insomnia: "Santa Claus Conquers the Martians" (Season 1, Episode 7) (2005)
 Clone High: "Snowflake Day: A Very Special Holiday Episode" (Season 1, Episode 11) (2003)
 Coming of Age: "Christmas at the Dunes" (Season 2, Episode 10) (1989)
 Cristela: "It's Not About the Tamales" (Season 1, Episode 9) (2014)
 The Crew: "The Worst Noel" (Season 1, Episode 13) (1995)
 Curb Your Enthusiasm: "Mary, Joseph and Larry" (Season 3, Episode 9) (2002)
 Cybill: "A Hell of a Christmas" (Season 3, Episode 11) (1996)
 Drake & Josh: "Merry Christmas, Drake & Josh" (2008)
 Danger Force: 
  "Down Goes Santa" (Season 1, Episode 12-13) (2020)
  "Krampapalooza" (Season 2, Episode 5) (2021)
 Dads: "The Glitch That Stole Christmas" (Season 1, Episode 11) (2013)
 DAG: "A Whitman Christmas Sampler" (Season 1, Episode 5) (2000)
 Date with the Angels: "The Christmas Show" (Season 2, Episode 14) (1957)
 Dave's World: "I Saw Mommy Kicking Santa Claus" (2-part episode) (Season 1, Episode 13 & 14) (1993)
 Day by Day: "Merry Kristin" (Season 2, Episode 6) (1988)
 D.C. Follies: "Reagan Accidentally Gives Fred a Nuke for Christmas" (Season 1, Episode 12) (1987)
 Dear Phoebe: "The Christmas Show" (Season 1, Episode 16) (1954)
 Dharma & Greg: "Haus Arrest" (Season 1, Episode 12) (1997)
 Difficult People: "Difficult Christmas" (Season 1, Episode 8) (2015)
 Dinosaurs: "Refrigerator Day" (Season 2, Episode 12) (1991)
 The Donna Reed Show: "A Very Merry Christmas" (Season 1, Episode 14) (1958)
 Double Trouble: "O Come All Ye Faithful" (Season 2, Episode 4) (1984)
 Down to Earth: "Christmas Story" (Season 4, Episode 24) (1984)
 Dr. Katz, Professional Therapist: "Office Management" (Season 2, Episode 4) (1995)
 Drexell's Class: "Silent Night, Holy Smokes" (Season 1, Episode 12) (1991)
 The Ellen Show: "Ellen's First Christmess" (Season 1, Episode 11) (2001)
 Empty Nest: "A Christmas Story" (Season 2, Episode 11) (1989)
 The Eve Arden Show: "The Christmas Angel" (Season 1, Episode 14) (1957)
 The Exes: "How the Grinch Spent Xmas" (Season 3, Episode 12) (2013)
 Fair Exchange: "'Twas the Fortnight Before Christmas" (Season 1, Episode 14) (1962)
 Family Affair (1966 TV series): "Christmas Came a Little Early" (Season 3, Episode 7) (1968)
 Family Affair (2002 TV series): "Holiday Fever" (Season 1, Episode 11) (2002)
 A Fairly Odd Christmas (2012)
 The Famous Teddy Z: "Season's Greetings from Al Floss" (1989)
 The Fanelli Boys: "A Fanelli Christmas" (Season 1, Episode 11) (1990)
 First Time Out: "O Christmas Tree" (Season 1, Episode 12) (1995)
 Fish: "A Fish Christmas" (Season 2, Episode 9) (1977)
 Flo: "The Miracle of Casa de Huevos" (Season 2, Episode 9) (1980)
 The Flying Nun: "Wailing in a Winter Wonderland" (Season 1, Episode 17) (1967)
 For Your Love: "The Married Little Christmas" (Season 5, Episode 9) (2002)
 Freddie: "I'll Be Homeless For Christmas" (Season 1, Episode 9) (2005)
 The Geena Davis Show: "How the Mom Stole Christmas" (Season 1, Episode 10) (2000)
 George Burns Comedy Week: "Christmas Carol II - The Sequel" (Season 1, Episode 12) (1985)
 The George Burns Show: "A Wife for Christmas" (Season 1, Episode 9) (1958)
 Getting Together: "Blue Christmas" (Season 1, Episode 11) (1971)
 The Ghost and Mrs. Muir: "The Ghost and Christmas Past" (Season 2, Episode 14) (1969)
 Ghosts: "The Christmas Spirit" (2-part episode) (Season 2, Episode 9) (2022)
 Gilligan's Island: "Birds Gotta Fly, Fish Gotta Talk" (Season 1, Episode 12) (1964)
 Glenn Martin, DDS: "Deck the Malls" (Season 1, Episode 14) (2009)
 Good Morning, Miami: "Jake's Nuts Roasting on an Open Fire" (Season 1, Episode 12) (2003)
 Good News: "A Christmas Story" (Season 1, Episode 13) (1997)
 Goodnight, Beantown: "Peace on Earth" (Season 2, Episode 10) (1983)
 Go On: "The World Ain't Over 'Till It's Over" (Season 1, Episode 11) (2012)Game Shakers: "A Reggae Potato Christmas" (Season 1, Episode 11) (2015)
 Great News: "A Christmas Carol Wendelson" (Season 2, Episode 7) (2017)
 Green Acres: "An Old Fashioned Christmas" (Season 2, Episode 13) (1966)
 Greetings from Tucson: "Christmas" (Season 1, Episode 9) (2002)
 Grindl: "'Twas the Week Before Christmas" (Season 1, Episode 13) (1963)
 Grounded for Life: "I Saw Daddy Hitting Santa Claus" (Season 2, Episode 7) (2001)
 Guys with Kids: "Christmas" (Season 1, Episode 10) (2012)
 Half & Half: "The Big How the Ex Stole Christmas Episode" (Season 2, Episode 11) (2003)
 Happy Hour: "A Dead Man's Ham" (Season 1, Episode 12) (2006)
 Harper Valley PTA: "Harper Valley Christmas" (Season 2, Episode 6) (1981)
 Head of the Class: "Viki's Torn Genes" ( Season 5, Episode 15) (1990)
 Herman's Head: "A Charlie Brown Fitzer" ( Season 2, Episode 13) (1992)
 The Hogan Family: "Ho, Ho, Hogans" (Season 6, Episode 13) (1991)
 The Honeymooners: "'Twas the Night Before Christmas" (Season 1, Episode 13) (1955)
 Henry Danger:
  "Christmas Danger" (Season 2, Episode 9) (2015)
  "Holiday Punch" (Season 5, Episode 30) (2019)
 Hope & Gloria: "The Dupree Family Christmas" (Season 2, Episode 10) (1995)
 Hot in Cleveland: "Cold in Cleveland: The Christmas Episode" (Season 6, Episode 7) (2014)
 How to Rock: "How To Rock Christmas" (Season 1, Episode 26)  (2012)
 House Calls: "Kensington Follies" (Season 2, Episode 5) (1980)
 iCarly: "iChristmas" (Season 2, Episode 7) (2008)
 I Love Lucy: "The I Love Lucy Christmas Special" (Season 6, Episode 11) (1956)
 I'm a Big Girl Now: "The First Christmas" (Season 1, Episode 7) (1980)
 I'm with Her: "The Greatest Christmas Story Ever Told" (Season 1, Episode 10) (2003)
 In-Laws: "Married Christmas" (Season 1, Episode 12) (2002)
 It's All Relative: "The Santa That Came to Dinner" (Season 1, Episode 11) (2003)
 It's Always Sunny in Philadelphia: "A Very Sunny Christmas" (Season 6, Episodes 13 & 14) (2010)
 It's Garry Shandling's Show: "It's Garry Shandling's Christmas Show" (Season 2, Episode 8) (1988)
 It's Your Move: "The Christmas Show" (Season 1, Episode 11) (1984)
 The Jamie Foxx Show (Season 3, Episode 10): "Christmas Day-Ja Vu" (Season 3, Episode 10) (1998)
 The Jeff Foxworthy Show: "Merry Christmas, Y'all" (Season 2, Episode 10) (1996)
 Jenny: "A Girl's Gotta Deck the Halls" (Season 1, Episode 7) (1997)
 Jesse: "The Christmas Party" (Season 2, Episode 9) (1999)
 Joanie Loves Chachi: "Christmas Show" (Season 2, Episode 11) (1982)
 Joe's Life: "Yule Be Sorry" (Season 1, Episode 11) (1993)
 The Joey Bishop Show: "Baby's First Christmas" (Season 3, Episode 11) (1963)
 Julia: "I'm Dreaming of a Black Christmas" Season 1, Episode 14) (1968)
 Just the Ten of Us: "A Christmas Story" (Season 2, Episode 8) (1988)
 Kenan & Kel: "Merry Christmas, Kenan" (Season 1, Episode 11) (1996)
 Kate & Allie: "The Nightmare Before Christmas" (Season 5, Episode 12) (1987)
 Kath & Kim: "Friends" (Season 1, Episode 9) (2008)
 Kenan: "Christmas" (Season 1, Episode 11) (2021)
 Kentucky Jones: "Ho, Ho, Ho" (Season 1, Episode 11) (1964)
 The Kids Are Alright: "Christmas 1972" (Season 1, Episode 8) (2018)
 Kirk: "The Christmas Show"  (Season 1, Episode 12) (1995)
 Ladies Man: "Aloha Christmas" (Season 1, Episode 12) (1999)
 Leave It to Beaver: "The Haircut" (Season 1, Episode 4) (1957)
 Life's Work: "Fired" (Season 1, Episode 12) (1996)
 The Little People: "The Christmas Pageant" (Season 1, Episode 14) (1972)
 A Loud House Christmas (2021)
 Lopez vs Lopez: "Lopez Vs. Christmas" (2022)
 Love, American Style: "Love and the Christmas Punch" (Season 4, Episode 10) (1972)
 Love & War: "A Christmas Kvell" (Season 1, Episode 12) (1992)
 Mad About You: "Met Someone" (Season 1, Episode 11) (1992)
 Madman of the People: "It's a Mad, Mad, Mad, Mad Christmas" (Season 1. Episode 12) (1994)
 Major Dad: "The Gift of the Major" (Season 2, Episode 12) (1990)
 Malibu Country: "Merry Malibu Christmas" (Season 1, Episode 7) (2012)
 Mama: "The Night the Animals Talked" (Season 3, Episode 16) (1953)
 Man with a Plan (Season 1, Episode 7): "Winter Has Come" (2016)
 Mary Hartman, Mary Hartman: "Episode 190" (Season 2, Episode 190) (1977)
 The Mayor: "Grey Christmas" (Season 1, Episode 9) (2017)
 McHale's Navy: "The Day They Captured Santa" (Season 1, Episode 11) (1962)
 Meego: "I Won't Be Home for Christmas" (Season 1, Episode 10) (1997)
 Meet Corliss Archer: "The Christmas Story" (Season 1, Episode 39) (1954)
 Tyler Perry's Meet the Browns: "Meet the Christmas Spirit" (Season 3, Episode 9) (December 9, 2009)
 Meet Mr. McNutley: "The Christmas Story" (Season 2, Episode 15) (1953)
 Merry Happy Whatever (2019)
 The Michael J. Fox Show: "Christmas" (Season 1, Episode 11) (2013)
 Minor Adjustments: "A Christmas Story" (Season 1, Episode 20) (1996)
 A Minute with Stan Hooper: "Bye, Bye, Miss American Pie" (Season 1, Episode 6) (2003)
 Mister Ed: "Ed's Christmas Story" (Season 4, Episode 12) (1963)
 Moesha: "A Class Act Christmas" (Season 4, Episode 9) (1998)
 The Monkees: "The Christmas Show" (Season 2, Episode 15) (1967)
 Mork & Mindy: "Mork's First Christmas" (Season 1, Episode 13) (1978)
 Mr. Mayor: "Mr. Mayor's Magical L.A. Christmas" (Season 1, Episode 10) (2021)
 Mr. President: "The Christmas Story" (Season 2, Episode 10) (1987)
 Mr. Rhodes: "The Christmas Show" (Season 1, Episode 11) (1996)
 Mulaney: "It's a Wonderful Home Alone" (Season 1, Episode 8) (2014)
 The Munsters: "Grandpa Leaves Home" (Season 1, Episode 14) (1964)
 The Muppets: "Single All the Way" (Season 1, Episode 10) (2015)
 My Mother the Car: "Many Happy No-Returns" (Season 1, Episode 15) (1965)
 My Sister Eileen: "Ebenezer Scrooge Appopolous" (Season 1, Episode 11) (1960)
 My Sister Sam: "Jingle Bell Rock Bottom" (Season 1, Episode 10) (1986)
 My World and Welcome to It: "Rally Round the Flag" (Season 1, Episode 14) (1969)
 Mythic Quest: "The 12 Hours of Christmas" (Season 3, Episode 6) (2022)
 The Naked Truth: "Sewer Gators, Swordplay, Santa from Hell!" (Season 1, Episode 12) (1995)
 Ned & Stacey: "Les Is More or Less Moral-less" (Season 2, Episode 5) (1996)
 The Neighborhood : "Welcome to the Scooter" (Season 2, Episode 11) (2019)
 Neo Yokio: "Pink Christmas" (2017)
 The New Addams Family: "Christmas With The Addams Family" (Season 1, Episode 27) (1998)
 The New Adventures of Old Christine: "It's Beginning to Stink a Lot Like Christmas" (Season 5, Episode 11) (2009)
 The New Dick Van Dyke Show: "The Jailbird" (Season 2, Episode 14) (1972)
 The New Gidget: "A Christmas Curl" (Season 2, Episode 13) (1987)
 The New Leave It to Beaver: "Home for Christmas" (Season 2, Episode 16) (1986)
 The New Normal: "Baby Proofing" (Season 1, Episode 11) (2012)
 Nicky, Ricky, Dicky & Dawn: "Santa’s Little Harpers" (Season 1, Episode 10) (2014)
 Nikki: "The Crybaby Who Stole Christmas" (Season 1, Episode 9) (2000)
 The Norm Show: "Norm vs. Christmas" (Season 2, Episode 12) (1999)
 Normal, Ohio: "Just Another Normal Christmas" (Season 1, Episode 7) (2000)
 Nurses: "The Shift of the Magi" (Season 3, Episode 11) (1993)
 The Odd Couple (1970 TV series): "Scrooge Gets an Oscar" (Season 1, Episode 12) (1970)
 The Odd Couple (2015 TV series): "Felix Navidad" (Season 3, Episode 8) (2016)
 Oh, Grow Up: "The Parent Trap" (Season 1, Episode 9–10) (1999)
 On Our Own: "All I Want for Christmas" (Season 1, Episode 12) (1994)
 Operation Petticoat: "I'm Dreaming of a Pink Christmas" (Season 1, Episode 12) (1977)
 Out All Night: "The Three Wise Men" (Season 1, Episode 11) (1992)
 The Parent 'Hood: "The Man Who Canceled Christmas" (Season 2, Episode 11) (1995)
 The Parkers: "Secret Santa" (Season 3, Episode 11) (December 17, 2001)
 Partners: "Fourteen Minutes?" (Season 1, Episode 12) (1995)
 The Partridge Family: "Don't Bring Your Guns to Town, Santa" (Season 2, Episode 13) (1971)
 The Patty Duke Show: "Christmas Present" (Season 1, Episode 15) (1963)
 Pearl: "Christmas Daze" (Season 1, Episode 12) (1996)
 Perfect Harmony: Merry Jaxmas (Season 1, Episode 10) (2019)
 Pete and Gladys: "Christmas Shopping" (Season 2, Episode 12) (December 4, 1961)
 The People's Choice: "The Christmas Story" (Season 1, Episode 12) (1955)
 Phenom: "A Very Doolan Christmas" (Season 1, Episode 12) (1993)
 Phyllis: "The Christmas Party" (Season 2, Episode 13) (1976)
 The PJs: "How the Super Stoled Christmas" (Season 1, Episode 14) (1999)
 The Pride of the Family: "Christmas Story" (Season 1, Episode 12) (1953)
 The Pruitts of Southampton: "Santa Was a Lady" (Season 1, Episode 14) (1966)
 Quintuplets: "Bob and Carol Save Christmas" (Season 1, Episode 18) (2004)
 Romeo!: "A Little So'em So'em for Christmas" (Season 1, Episode 11) (2003)
 The Real McCoys: "The Diamond Ring" (Season 5, Episode 8) (1961)
 The Real O'Neals: "The Real Christmas" (Season 2, Episode 8) (2016)
 Reba: "Cookies for Santa" (Season 2, Episode 10) (2002)
 Rhoda: "Guess What I Got You for the Holidays" (Season 1, Episode 16) (1974)
 The Rickey Smiley Show: "Captive Christmas" (Season 2, Episode 15) (December 13, 2013)
 The Righteous Gemstones: "Interlude II" (Season 2, Episode 5) (2022)
 Rocky Road: "Suzie Claus Is Coming to Town" (1985)
 Roll Out: "Christmas of '44" (Season 1, Episode 10) (1973)
 The Ruggles: "Christmas Eve" (1949)
 Rules of Engagement: "Little Bummer Boy" (Season 5, Episode 12) (2010)
 Sanford and Son: "Ebenezer Sanford" (Season 5, Episode 12) (1975)
 The Santa Clauses (2022)
 Schitt’s Creek: "Merry Christmas, Johnny Rose" (Season 4, Episode 13)(1975)
 Schooled: "Beanie Babies" (Season 2, Episode 10) (2019)
 School of Rock: "Jingle Bell Rock" (Season 3, Episode 9) (2017)
 Sean Saves the World: "Best Friends for Never" (Season 1, Episode 9) (2013)
 The Second Hundred Years: "Luke's First Christmas" (Season 1, Episode 15) (1967)
 Side Hustle:
  "Friendiversary" (Season 1, Episode 5) (2020)
  "A Mouth Nose Christmas" (Season 2, Episode 7) (2021)
 Sister Kate: "Father Christmas" (Season 1, Episode 13) (1989)
 Sister, Sister: "Christmas" (Season 3, Episode 12) (1995)
 The Smothers Brothers Show: "'Twas the Week Before Christmas" (Season 1, Episode 14) (1965)
 So Little Time: "Outbreak" (Season 1, Episode 13) (2001)
 Something So Right: "Something About a Christmas Miracle" (Season 1, Episode 11) 1996)
 Something Wilder: "Gotta Dance" (Season 1, Episode 6) (1994)
 Son of Zorn: "The War on Grafelnik" (Season 1, Episode 9) (2016)
 Sparks: "Silent Night" (Season 2, Episode 13) (1997)
 Square Pegs: "A Child's Christmas in Weemawee" (Season 1, Episode 11) (1982)
 Stanley: "Christmas Episode" (Season 1, Episode 20) (1956)
 Stark Raving Mad: "Christmas Cheerleader" (Season 1, Episode 11) (1999)
 Svengoolie: "Abbott and Costello Meet the Invisible Man" (2006)
 Superior Donuts: "Homeless for the Holidays" (Season 2, Episode 7) (2017)
 Super Fun Night: "Merry Super Fun Christmas" (Season 1, Episode 9) (2013)
 Tacoma FD: "A Christmas Story" (Season 2, Episode 13) (2020)
 Temperatures Rising: "Rx: Christmas" (Season 1, Episode 14) (1972)
 That's Life: "'Twas the Night Before Christmas" (Season 1, Episode 12), "Our First Christmas" (Season 1, Episode 13) (1968)
 Thea: "A Christmas Story" (Season 1, Episode 12) (1993)
 Three's Company: "Three's Christmas" (Season 2, Episode 14) (1977)
 Throb: "One Christmas" (Season 2, Episode 12) (1987)
 'Til Death: "No Complaints" (Season 4, Episode 4) (2009)
 The Tony Danza Show: "A Christmas Story" (Season 1, Episode 11) (1998)
 The Tony Randall Show: "Case: O Come All Ye Wastrels" (Season 1, Episode 11) (1976)
 Too Close for Comfort: "Mr. Christmas" (Season 3, Episode 11) (1982)
 Townies: "Christmas" (Season 1, Episode 11) (1996)
 The Tracy Morgan Show: "Christmas" (Season 1, Episode 3) (2003)
 Trophy Wife: "'Twas the Night Before Christmas...or 'Twas It?" (Season 1, Episode 10) (2013)
 Tucker: "A Rottweiler Runs Through It" (Season 1, Episode 13) (2001)
 TV Funhouse: "Christmas Day" (Season 1, Episodd 3) (2000)
 Two Guys, a Girl, and a Pizza Place: "Two Guys, a Girl, and a Christmas Story" (Season 2, Episode 12) (1998)
 Two of a Kind: "A Very Carrie Christmas" (Season 1, Episode 11) (1998)
 The Two of Us: "The Christmas Thief" (Season 2, Episode 10) (1981)
 That Girl Lay Lay: "Fa-La-La-La-La-La-La-Lay Lay" (Season 1, Episode 12) (2021)
 The Thundermans: "Winter Thunderland" (Season 2, Episode 11) (2014)
 True Jackson, VP: "Telling Amanda" (Season 1, Episode 5) (2008)
 Tyler Perry's Meet the Browns: "Meet the Christmas Spirit" (Season 3, Episode 9) (2009)
 Tyler Perry's Young Dylan: "Waiting for Santa" (Season 2, Episode 19) (2021)
 Undateable: "A Box of Puppies Walks Into a Bar" (Season 3, Episode 9) (2015)
 Unhappily Ever After: "Hot Wheels" (Season 2, Episode 12) (1995)
 Union Square: "The First Christmas Show" (Season 1, Episode 10) (1997)
 United States of Al: "Christmas/Krismis" (Season 2, Episode 9) (2021)
 Victorious: "A Christmas Tori" (Season 2, Episode 12) (2011)
 The Wackiest Ship in the Army: "I'm Dreaming of a Wide Isthmus" (Season 1, Episode 14) (1965)
 Wanda at Large: "'Twas the Knife Before Christmas" (Season 2, Episode 12) (2003)
 We Got It Made: "Upstairs, Downstairs (a.k.a. Christmas Clip Show)" (Season 2, Episode 13) (1987)
 Whitney: "Christmas Is Cummings" (Season 1, Episode 10) (2011)
 Woops!: "Say It Ain't So Santa" (Season 1, Episode 10) (1992)
 Workaholics: "The Strike" (Season 1, Episode 6) (2011)
 Worst Week: "The Gift" (Season 1, Episode 11) (2008)
 Yes, Dear: "All I Want for Christmas Is My Dead Uncle's Cash" (Season 1, Episode 11) (2000)
 You Take the Kids: "Merry Christmas to All and a Pointy Hat to You" (Season 1, Episode 2) (1990)
 Young & Hungry: "Young & Christmas" (Season 2, Episode 21) (2015)

2 Broke Girls
 "And the Very Christmas Thanksgiving" (Season 1, Episode 10) (November 21, 2011)
 "And the High Holidays" (Season 2, Episode 12) (December 17, 2012)
 "And a Loan for Christmas" (Season 4, Episode 7) (December 15, 2014)

227
 "Mary's Christmas" (Season 1, Episode 13) (December 14, 1985)
 "The Night They Arrested Santa Claus" (Season 4, Episode 9) (December 10, 1988)
 "Guess Who's Not Coming to Christmas" (Season 5, Episode 12) (December 16, 1989)

30 Rock
  "Ludachristmas" (Season 2, Episode 9) (December 13, 2007)
  "Christmas Special (30 Rock)|Christmas Special" (Season 3, Episode 6) (December 11, 2008)
  "Secret Santa" (Season 4, Episode 8) (December 10, 2009)
  "Christmas Attack Zone" (Season 5, Episode 10) (December 9, 2010)
  "My Whole Life Is Thunder" (Season 7, Episode 8) (December 6, 2012)

8 Simple Rules
 "All I Want for Christmas" (Season 1, Episode 12) (December 10, 2002)
 "A Very C.J. Christmas" (Season 3, Episode 12) (December 17, 2004)

According to Jim
 "An According to Jiminy Christmas" (Season 1, Episode 10) (December 12, 2001)
 "The Christmas Party" (Season 2, Episode 10) (December 10, 2002)
 "Secret Santa" (Season 3, Episode 13) (December 9, 2003)
 "Stalking Santa" (Season 4, Episode 10) (December 14, 2004)
 "The Gift of the Maggie" (Season 5, Episode 12) (December 13, 2005)
 "Two for the Money" (Season 8, Episode 5) (December 16, 2008)

Adult Swim
 Black Dynamite: "'A Crisis at Christmas' or 'The Dark Side of the Dark Side of the Moon!" (Season 1, Episode 4) (August 5, 2012)
 Black Jesus: "A Very Special Christmas In Compton" (Season 2, Episode 11) (November 27, 2015)
 The Boondocks: "A Huey Freeman Christmas""(Season 1, Episode 7) (December 18, 2005)
 Metalocalypse: "Dethmas" (Season 3, Episode 4) (December 7, 2009)
 Mike Tyson Mysteries: "The Christmas Episode" (Season 4, Episode 11) (December 10, 2019)
 Moral Orel: "The Best Christmas Ever" (Season 1, Episode 10) (December 13, 2005)
 Sealab 2021: "Feast of Alvis" (Season 2, Episode 8) (December 29, 2002)
 Smiling Friends: "Charlie Dies and Doesn't Come Back" (Season 1, Episode 8) (January 30, 2022)
 Space Ghost Coast to Coast: "Waiting for Edward" (Season 5, Episode 11) (December 25, 1998)
 Stroker & Hoop: "I Saw Stroker Killing Santa Claus (a.k.a. A Cold, Dead, White Christmas)" (Season 1, Episode 10) (December 4, 2005)
 Superjail!: "Mr. Grumpy-Pants" (Season 1, Episode 7) (November 9, 2008)
 Three Busy Debras: "A Very Debra Christmas" (Season 1, Episode 1) (March 29, 2020)
 Tom Goes to the Mayor: "Rats Off to Ya!" (Season 1, Episode 5) (December 19, 2004)
 The Venture Bros.: "A Very Venture Christmas" (Season 1, Episode 14) (December 19, 2004)
 YOLO: Crystal Fantasy: "A Very Extremely Very Yolo Christmas: Reloaded" (Season 1, Episode 3) (August 16, 2020)

Aqua Teen Hunger Force
 "Mail Order Bride" (Season 1, Episode 17) (December 22, 2002)
 "Cybernetic Ghost of Christmas Past from the Future" (Season 1, Episode 18) (December 29, 2002)
 "T-Shirt of the Dead" (Season 3, Episode 11) (October 10, 2004)
 "A PE Christmas" (Season 7, Episode 1) (December 13, 2009)

NTSF:SD:SUV::
 "Christmas Activity" (Season 2, Episode 14) (December 7, 2012)
 "Wreck the Malls" (Season 3, Episode 12) (December 13, 2013)

Rick and Morty
 "Anatomy Park" (Season 1, Episode 3) (December 16, 2013)
 "Rattlestar Ricklactica" (Season 4, Episode 5) (December 15, 2019)
 "Ricktional Mortpoon's Rickmas Mortcation" (Season 6, Episode 10) (December 11, 2022)

Robot Chicken
  "Christmas Special" (Season 1, Episode 22) (December 22, 2005)
  "Robot Chicken's Half-Assed Christmas Special" (Season 3, Episode 14) (December 9, 2007)
  "Dear Consumer" (Season 4, Episode 20) (December 6, 2009)
  "Robot Chicken's DP Christmas Special" (Season 5, Episode 1) (December 12, 2010)
  "Robot Chicken's ATM Christmas Special" (Season 6, Episode 13) (December 17, 2012)
  "Born Again Virgin Christmas Special" (Season 6, Episode 21) (December 17, 2013)
  "Lots of Holidays But Don't Worry Christmas Is Still in There Too So Pull the Stick Out of Your Ass Fox News Special" (Season 7, Episode 20) (December 7, 2014)
  "Robot Chicken Christmas Special: The X-Mas United" (Season 8, Episode 7) (December 13, 2015)
  "Freshly Baked: The Robot Chicken Santa Claus Pot Cookie Freakout Special: Special Edition" (Season 9, Episode 1) (December 10, 2017)
  "Robot Chicken's Santa's Dead (Spoiler Alert) Holiday Murder Thing Special" (Season 10, Episode 11) (December 9, 2019)

Squidbillies
  "Rebel with a Claus" (Season 2, Episode 14) (December 24, 2006)
  "The War on The War on Christmas" (Season 11, Episode 9) (December 10, 2017)

Tim and Eric Awesome Show, Great Job!
  "Man Milk" (Season 5, Episode 10) (May 2, 2010)
 "Chrimbus Special" (December 5, 2010)

The Adventures of Ozzie & Harriet
  "The Boys Earn Some Christmas Money" (Season 1, Episode 12) (December 19, 1952)
  "The Late Christmas Gift" (Season 1, Episode 13) (December 26, 1952)
  "The Miracle" (Season 2, Episode 15) (December 25, 1953)
  "The Lost Christmas Gift" (Season 3, Episode 10) (December 24, 1954)
  "The Fruitcake" (Season 3, Episode 11) (January 7, 1955)
  "Christmas in October" (Season 5, Episode 4) (October 24, 1956)
  "A Busy Christmas" (Season 5, Episode 12) (December 19, 1956)
  "The Day After Christmas" (Season 5, Episode 13) (December 26, 1956)
  "The Christmas Tree Lot" (Season 6, Episode 11) (December 18, 1957)
  "The Girl in the Emporium" (Season 9, Episode 12) (December 14, 1960)
  "A Piano for the Fraternity" (Season 9, Episode 13) (December 21, 1960)

ALF
  "Oh, Tannerbaum" (Season 1, Episode 12) (December 15, 1986)
  "ALF's Special Christmas" (Season 2, Episodes 12 & 13) (December 14, 1987)

Alice
  "A Semi-Merry Christmas" (Season 2, Episode 9) (December 18, 1977)
  "Mel, the Magi" (Season 4, Episode 11) (December 23, 1979)
  "Mel's Christmas Carol" (Season 6, Episode 9) (December 20, 1981)
  Tis the Sto Be Jealous" (Season 8, Episode 10) (December 25, 1983)

All in the Family/Archie Bunker's Place/Gloria
  "Christmas Day at the Bunkers" (Season 2, Episode 13) (December 18, 1971)
  "Edith's Christmas Story" (Season 4, Episode 15) (December 22, 1973)
  "The Draft Dodger" (Season 7, Episode 14) (December 25, 1976)
  "Edith's Crisis of Faith: Part 1 & 2" (Season 8, Episodes 11 & 12) (December 18, 1977)
  "The Bunkers Go West" (Season 9, Episode 11) (December 10, 1978)
  "California, Here We Are" (Season 9, Episodes 12 & 13) (December 17, 1978)
  "Father Christmas" (Season 4, Episode 13) (December 19, 1982)
  "Miracle at Fox Ridge" (Season 1, Episode 11) (1982)

All of Us
 "I Saw Tia Kissing Santa Claus" (Season 1, Episode 11) (December 16, 2003)
  "Home for Christmas" (Season 2, Episode 10) (December 10, 2004)
  "Who Took the Merry Out of Christmas?" (Season 3, Episode 11) (December 12, 2005)
  "Everybody Loves Rain Man" (Season 4, Episode 10) (December 11, 2006)

Almost Perfect
  "Risky Christmas" (Season 1, Episode 12) (December 11, 1995)
  "Gimme Shelter" (Season 2, Episode 7) (December 24, 1997)

Amen
  "Your Christmas Show of Shows" (Season 1, Episode 11) (December 20, 1986)
  "The Twelve Songs of Christmas" (Season 2, Episode 11) (December 19, 1987)
  "The Deacon's Donkey" (Season 3, Episode 10) (December 10, 1988)
  "Thelma Frye, Dough Girl" (Season 4, Episode 12) (December 16, 1989)
  "Miracle on 134th Street" (Season 5, Episodes 5 & 6) (December 22, 1990)

American Dad!
  "The Best Christmas Story Never Told" (Season 2, Episode 9) (December 17, 2006)
  "The Most Adequate Christmas Ever" (Season 3, Episode 8) (December 16, 2007)
  "Rapture's Delight" (Season 6, Episode 9) (December 13, 2009)
  "For Whom the Sleigh Bell Tolls" (Season 7, Episode 8) (December 12, 2010)
  "Season's Beatings" (Season 8, Episode 7) (December 11, 2011)
  "Minstrel Krampus" (Season 9, Episode 8) (December 15, 2013)
  "Dreaming of a White Porsche Christmas" (Season 12, Episode 6) (December 1, 2014)
  "Gifted Me Liberty" (Season 13, Episode 20) (June 13, 2016)
  "Ninety North, Zero West" (Season 14, Episode 7) (December 19, 2016)
  "Santa, Schmanta" (Season 15, Episode 1) (December 25, 2017)
  "Yule. Tide. Repeat." (Season 17, Episode 22) (December 21, 2020)
  "The Grounch" (Season 19, Episode 22) (December 19, 2022)

American Housewife
  "Krampus Katie" (Season 1, Episode 9) (December 13, 2016)
  "Blue Christmas" (Season 2, Episode 10) (December 13, 2017)
  "Saving Christmas" (Season 3, Episode 10) (December 12, 2018)
  "The Bromance Before Christmas" (Season 4, Episode 10) (December 13, 2019)

Arnie
  "Let Them Eat Cookies" (Season 1, Episode 13) (December 12, 1970)
  "The Gift of the Majors" (Season 2, Episode 13) (December 18, 1971)

Arrested Development
  "In God We Trust" (Season 1, Episode 7) (December 14, 2003)
  "Afternoon Delight" (Season 2, Episode 6) (December 19, 2004)

Baby Daddy
  "A Wheeler Family Christmas Outing" (Season 1, Episode 9) (August 22, 2012)
  "Emma's First Christmas" (Season 2, Episode 16) (December 11, 2013)
  "It's a Wonderful Emma" (Season 4, Episode 2) (December 10, 2014)

Barney Miller
  "Christmas Story" (Season 3, Episode 10) (December 23, 1976)
  "Toys" (Season 5, Episode 12) (December 14, 1978)
  "Homeless" (Season 8, Episode 7) (December 17, 1981)

Beavis and Butt-head
  "A Very Special Christmas With Beavis and Butt-head" (Season 3, Episode 29) (December 17, 1993)
  "Huh-Huh-Humbug/It’s a Miserable Life" (Season 6, Episode 7 & 8)  (December 19, 1995)

Becker
  "Santa on Ice" (Season 2, Episode 12) (December 14, 1999)
  "Dr. Angry Head" (Season 3, Episode 9) (December 11, 2000)
  "The Ghost of Christmas Presents" (Season 4, Episode 10) (December 10, 2001)
  "Chris-Mess" (Season 5, Episode 10) (December 15, 2002)

Benson
 "Mary and Her Lambs" (Season 4, Episode 10) (December 17, 1982)
 "Home for Christmas" (Season 6, Episode 13) (December 21, 1984)

The Bernie Mac Show
  "A Christmas Story" (Season 1, Episode 7) (December 19, 2001)
  "Road to Tradition" (Season 3, Episode 3) (December 14, 2003)

The Beverly Hillbillies
  "Home for Christmas" (Season 1, Episode 13) (December 19, 1962)
  "No Place Like Home" (Season 1, Episode 14) (December 26, 1962)
  "The Clampetts Get Culture" (Season 2, Episode 13) (December 18, 1963)
  "Christmas at the Clampetts" (Season 2, Episode 14) (December 25, 1963)
  "The Christmas Present" (Season 5, Episode 15) (December 21, 1966)
  "The Week Before Christmas" (Season 7, Episode 13) (December 18, 1968)
  "Christmas in Hooterville" (Season 7, Episode 14) (December 25, 1968)

Bewitched
  "A Vision of Sugar Plums" (Season 1, Episode 15) (December 24, 1964; re-aired in 1965 with new introductory scene)
  "Humbug Not to Be Spoken Here" (Season 4, Episode 16)  (December 21, 1967)
  "Santa Comes to Visit and Stays and Stays" (Season 6, Episode 14) (December 18, 1969)
  "Sisters at Heart" (Season 7, Episode 13) (December 24, 1970)

The Big Bang Theory
  "The Bath Item Gift Hypothesis" (Season 2, Episode 11) (December 15, 2008)
  "The Maternal Congruence" (Season 3, Episode 11) (December 14, 2009)
  "The Santa Simulation" (Season 6, Episode 11) (December 13, 2012)
  "The Cooper Extraction" (Season 7, Episode 11) (December 12, 2013)
  "The Clean Room Infiltration" (Season 8, Episode 11) (December 11, 2014)
  "The Holiday Summation" (Season 10, Episode 12) (January 5, 2017)

Black-ish/Mixed-ish
 "Black Santa/White Christmas" (Season 1, Episode 10) (December 10, 2014)
  "Stuff" (Season 2, Episode 10) (December 9, 2015)
  "Just Christmas, Baby" (Season 3, Episode 10) (December 14, 2016)
  "Sugar Daddy" (Season 4, Episode 9) (December 12, 2017)
  "Christmas in Theater Eight" (Season 5, Episode 8) (December 11, 2018)
  "Father Christmas" (Season 6, Episode 10) (December 10, 2019)
  "Compton Around the Christmas Tree" (Season 7, Episode 6) (December 2, 2020)
  "Do They Know It's Christmas?" (Season 1, Episode 10) (2019)

Bob
  "A Christmas Story" (Season 1, Episode 12) (December 21, 1992)
  "Have Yourself a Married Little Christmas" (Season 2, Episode 7) (1993 - unaired)

The Bob Cummings Show
  "A Date for Margaret/A Wife for Christmas" (Season 1, Episode 6) (February 6, 1955)
  "The Christmas Spirit" (Season 2, Episode 13) (December 15, 1955)
  "Grandpa's Christmas Visit" (Season 2, Episode 14) (December 22, 1955)
  "Bob's Christmas Party" (Season 4, Episode 13) (December 24, 1957)

The Bob Newhart Show
  "His Busiest Season" (Season 1, Episode 14) (December 24, 1972)
  "I'm Dreaming of a Slight Christmas" (Season 2, Episode 15) (December 22, 1973)
  "Home Is Where the Hurt Is" (Season 3, Episode 15) (December 21, 1974)
  "Bob Has to Have His Tonsils Out, So He Spends Christmas Eve in the Hospital" (Season 4, Episode 15) (December 20, 1975)
  "Making Up Is the Thing to Do" (Season 5, Episode 13) (December 25, 1976)
  "'Twas the Pie Before Christmas" (Season 6, Episode 12) (December 24, 1977)

Bob's Burgers
  "Bob Rest Ye Merry Gentle-Mannequins" (Season 3, Episode 9) (December 16, 2012)
  "Christmas in the Car" (Season 4, Episode 8) (December 15, 2013)
  "Father of the Bob" (Season 5, Episode 6) (December 7, 2014)
  "Nice-Capades" (Season 6, Episode 5) (November 15, 2015)
  "The Last Gingerbread House on the Left" (Season 7, Episode 7) (November 27, 2016)
  "The Bleakening, Parts 1 & 2" (Season 8, Episodes 6 & 7) (December 10, 2017)
  "Better Off Sled" (Season 9, Episode 10) (December 9, 2018)
  "Have Yourself a Maily Linda Christmas" (Season 10, Episode 10) (December 15, 2019)
  "Yachty or Nice" (Season 11, Episode 10) (December 13, 2020)
  "Gene's Christmas Break" (Season 12, Episode 10) (December 19, 2021)
  "The Plight Before Christmas" (Season 13, Episode 10) (December 11, 2022)

Boy Meets World / Girl Meets World
  "Santa's Little Helper" (Season 1, Episode 10) (December 10, 1993)
  "Turnaround" (Season 2, Episode 12) (December 9, 1994)
  "Easy Street" (Season 4, Episode 12) (December 13, 1996)
  "A Very Topanga Christmas" (Season 5, Episode 11) (December 19, 1997)
  "Santa's Little Helpers" (Season 6, Episode 11) (December 11, 1998)
  "Girl Meets Home for the Holidays" (Season 1, Episode 16) (2014)
  "Girl Meets A Christmas Maya" (Season 3, Episode 18) (2016)

The Brady Bunch
  "The Voice of Christmas" (Season 1, Episode 12) (December 19, 1969)
 A Very Brady Christmas (1988 - reunion special)

Brooklyn Nine-Nine
  "Christmas" (Season 1, Episode 11) (December 3, 2013)
  "The Pontiac Bandit Returns" (Season 2, Episode 10) (December 7, 2014)
  "Yippie Kayak" (Season 3, Episode 10) (December 13, 2015)
  "Captain Latvia" (Season 4, Episode 10) (December 13, 2016)

Caroline in the City
  "Caroline and the Christmas Break" (Season 1, Episode 10) (December 14, 1995)
  "Caroline and the Red Sauce" (Season 2, Episode 10) (December 10, 1996)
  "Caroline and the Decanter" (Season 3, Episode 12) (December 15, 1997)
  "Caroline and the Fright Before Christmas" (Season 4, Episode 11) (December 21, 1998)

Charles in Charge
  "Home for the Holidays" (Season 1, Episode 11) (December 19, 1984)
  "Yule Laff" (Season 3, Episode 5) (December 24, 1987)

Cheers
  "The Spy Who Came In for a Cold One" (Season 1, Episode 12) (December 16, 1982)
  "Christmas Cheers" (Season 6, Episode 12) (December 17, 1987)
  "Love Me, Love My Car" (Season 11, Episode 11) (December 17, 1992)

City Guys
  "A Gift of Friendship" (Season 1, Episode 14) (December 12, 1998)
  "Miracle on 134th Street and Lexington Avenue" (Season 2, Episode 20) (November 27, 1999)
  "Pier Pressure" (Season 4, Episode 25) (December 16, 2000)

The Cleveland Show
  "A Cleveland Brown Christmas" (Season 1, Episode 9) (December 13, 2009)
  "Murray Christmas" (Season 2, Episode 8) (December 5, 2010)
  "Die Semi-Hard" (Season 3, Episode 7) (December 11, 2011)
  "'Tis the Cleveland to be Sorry" (Season 4, Episode 6) (December 16, 2012)

Clueless
  "A Very PC Holiday" (Season 2, Episode 12) (December 16, 1997)
  "Our Lady of Rodeo Drive" (Season 3, Episode 9) (December 15, 1998)

Coach
  "Christmas Brains" (Season 3, Episode 12) (December 18, 1990)
  "My True Love Gave to Me..." (Season 5, Episode 12) (December 16, 1992)
  "Christmas of the Van Damned" (Season 6, Episode 12) (December 14, 1993)
  "You Win Some, You Lose Some" (Season 9, Episode 8) (December 18, 1996)

Comedy Central
 Li'l Bush: Merry Christmas (2007)
 Jeff Dunham's Very Special Christmas Special (2008)

Community
  "Comparative Religion" (Season 1, Episode 12) (December 10, 2009)
  "Abed's Uncontrollable Christmas" (Season 2, Episode 11) (December 9, 2010)
  "Regional Holiday Music" (Season 3, Episode 10) (December 8, 2011)
  "Intro to Knots" (Season 4, Episode 10) (April 18, 2013)

The Cosby Show
  "Father's Day" (Season 1, Episode 12) (December 20, 1984)
  "Getting to Know You" (Season 6, Episode 12) (December 14, 1989)
  "Clair's Place" (Season 8, Episode 12) (December 19, 1991)

Dear John
  "Dancing in the Dark" (Season 1, Episode 8) (December 15, 1988)
  "'Twas the Fight Before Christmas" (Season 4, Episode 11) (December 27, 1991)

December Bride
  "The Christmas Show" (Season 1, Episode 12) (December 20, 1954)
  "Car for Christmas" (Season 5, Episode 12) (December 18, 1958)

Dennis the Menace
  "Dennis and Christmas" (Season 1, Episode 11) (December 13, 1959)
  "The Christmas Horse" (Season 2, Episode 12) (December 25, 1960)
  "The Fifteen-Foot Christmas Tree" (Season 3, Episode 12) (December 25, 1961)

Designing Women
  "I'll Be Home for Christmas" (Season 2, Episode 12) (December 21, 1987)
  "Julia and Mary Jo Get Stuck Under a Bed" (Season 6, Episode 11) (December 2, 1991)
  "Tales Out of School" (Season 6, Episode 13) (December 16, 1991)

The Dick Van Dyke Show
 "The Alan Brady Show Presents" (Season 3, Episode 13) (1963)
 "Uhny Uftz" (Season 5, Episode 3) (1965)

A Different World
  "The Gift of the Magi" (Season 1, Episode 10) (December 17, 1987)
  "For Whom the Jingle Bell Tolls" (Season 3, Episode 10) (December 21, 1989)
  "I'm Dreaming of a Dwayne Christmas" (Season 4, Episode 11) (December 13, 1990)
  "Twelve Steps of Christmas" (Season 5, Episode 12) (December 19, 1991)
  "White Christmas" (Season 6, Episode 13) (December 17, 1992)

Diff'rent Strokes
  "Retrospective" (Season 1, Episodes 8 & 9) (December 29, 1978)
  "Santa's Helper" (Season 5, Episode 12) (December 18, 1982)

The Doris Day Show
 "A Two-Family Christmas" (Season 2, Episode 11) (December 22, 1969)
  "It's Christmas Time in the City" (Season 3, Episode 15) (December 21, 1970)
  "Whodunnit, Doris?" (Season 4, Episode 14) (December 13, 1971)

Dr. Ken
  "The Master Scheduler" (Season 1, Episode 10) (December 11, 2015)
  "A Park Family Christmas" (Season 2, Episode 11) (December 16, 2016)

The Drew Carey Show
  "Isomers Have Distinct Characteristics" (Season 1, Episode 12) (December 20, 1995)
  "Lisa Gets Married" (Season 2, Episode 11) (December 18, 1996)
  "The Vacation" (Season 3, Episode 12) (December 17, 1997)
  "Drew's Holiday Punch" (Season 4, Episode 13) (December 16, 1998)
  "Fetal Attraction" (Season 6, Episode 11) (December 20, 2000)

Ellen
  "The Christmas Show" (Season 2, Episode 12) (December 14, 1994)
  "Do You Fear What I Fear?" (Season 3, Episode 12) (December 20, 1995)
  "Fleas Navidad" (Season 4, Episode 12) (December 18, 1996)

Eve
  "'Twas the Fight Before Christmas" (Season 1, Episode 11) (December 15, 2003)
  "All About Christmas Eve" (Season 3, Episode 11) (December 15, 2005)

Evening Shade
  "The Wood Who Stole Christmas" (Season 1, Episode 11) (December 17, 1990)
  "I'll Be Home for Christmas" (Season 3, Episode 12) (December 21, 1992)

Everybody Hates Chris
  "Everybody Hates Christmas" (Season 1, Episode 11) (December 15, 2005)
  "Everybody Hates Kris" (Season 2, Episode 10) (December 11, 2006)
  "Everybody Hates Kwanzaa" (Season 3, Episode 10) (December 10, 2007)

Everybody Loves Raymond
  "The Ball" (Season 1, Episode 12) (December 20, 1996)
  "All I Want for Christmas" (Season 2, Episode 12) (December 15, 1997)
  "The Toaster" (Season 3, Episode 12) (December 14, 1998)
  "The Christmas Picture" (Season 4, Episode 11) (December 13, 1999)
  "Christmas Present" (Season 5, Episode 10) (December 11, 2000)
  "Seasons Greetings" (Season 6, Episode 12) (December 17, 2001)
  "The Thought That Counts" (Season 7, Episode 11) (December 9, 2002)
  "Jazz Records" (Season 8, Episode 10) (December 15, 2003)

The Facts of Life
  "The Christmas Show" (Season 5, Episode 12) (December 21, 1983)
  "Christmas in the Big House" (Season 6, Episode 14) (December 19, 1984)
  "Christmas Baby" (Season 7, Episode 13) (December 14, 1985)
  "It's a Wonderful Christmas" (Season 9, Episode 10) (December 12, 1987)

Family Guy
  "A Very Special Family Guy Freakin' Christmas" (Season 3 Episode 16) (December 21, 2001)
  "Road to the North Pole" (Season 9, Episode 7) (December 12, 2010)
  "Jesus, Mary and Joseph!" (Season 11, Episode 8) (December 23, 2012)
  "Christmas Guy" (Season 12, Episode 8) (December 15, 2013)
  "The 2000-Year-Old Virgin" (Season 13, Episode 6) (December 7, 2014)
  "How the Griffin Stole Christmas" (Season 15, Episode 9) (December 11, 2016)
  "Don't Be a Dickens at Christmas" (Season 16, Episode 9) (December 10, 2017)
  "Christmas is Coming" (Season 18, Episode 9) (December 15, 2019)
  "The First No L" (Season 19, Episode 9) (December 13, 2020)
  "Christmas Crime" (Season 20, Episode 10) (December 19, 2021)

Family Matters
  "Have Yourself a Very Winslow Christmas" (Season 2, Episode 13) (December 21, 1990)
  "It's Beginning to Look a Lot Like Urkel" (Season 4, Episode 12) (December 11, 1992)
  "Christmas Is Where the Heart Is" (Season 5, Episode 11) (December 10, 1993)
  "Miracle on Elm Street" (Season 6, Episode 11) (December 16, 1994)
  "Fa La La La Laaagghh!" (Season 7, Episode 11) (December 15, 1995)
  "It Came Upon a Midnight Clear" (Season 8, Episode 13) (December 13, 1996)
  "Deck the Malls" (Season 9, Episode 11) (December 19, 1997)

Family Ties
  "A Christmas Story" (Season 1, Episode 11) (December 15, 1982)
  "A Keaton Christmas Carol" (Season 2, Episode 9) (December 14, 1983)
  "Miracle in Columbus" (Season 6, Episode 17) (December 20, 1987)

Family Time
 "Merry Kwanzaa" (Season 4, Episode 12) (December 20, 2016)
 "Secret Stallworth" (Season 5, Episode 13) (December 18, 2017)
 "Scrooge" (Season 6, Episode 13) (December 17, 2018)
 "Christmas Beyond The Walls" (Season 8, Episode 12) (December 20, 2020)

Father Knows Best
  "The Christmas Story" (Season 1, Episode 12) (December 19, 1954)
  "The Angel's Sweater" (Season 3, Episode 15) (December 19, 1956)
 "Home for Christmas" (1977 - reunion special)

Frasier
  "Miracle on Third or Fourth Street" (Season 1, Episode 12) (December 16, 1993)
  "Frasier Grinch" (Season 3, Episode 9) (December 19, 1995)
  "Perspectives on Christmas" (Season 5, Episode 9) (December 16, 1997)
  "Merry Christmas, Mrs. Moskowitz" (Season 6, Episode 10) (December 17, 1998)
  "The Fight Before Christmas" (Season 7, Episode 11) (December 16, 1999)
  "Mary Christmas" (Season 8, Episode 8) (December 12, 2000)
  "We Two Kings" (Season 10, Episode 10) (December 10, 2002)
  "High Holidays" (Season 11, Episode 11) (December 9, 2003)

Fresh Off the Boat
  "The Real Santa" (Season 2, Episode 10) (December 8, 2015)
  "Where are the Giggles?" (Season 3, Episode 8) (December 13, 2016)
  "Do You Hear What I Hear?" (Season 4, Episode 10) (December 12, 2017)
  "Cousin Eddie" (Season 5, Episode 8) (December 14, 2018)
  "Jessica Town" (Season 6, Episode 10) (December 13, 2019)

The Fresh Prince of Bel-Air
  "Deck the Halls" (Season 1, Episode 15) (December 10, 1990)
  "Will's Christmas Show" (Season 2, Episode 13) (December 16, 1991)
  "'Twas the Night Before Christening" (Season 4, Episode 13) (December 20, 1993)
  "I, Oooh, Baby, Baby" (Season 6, Episode 11) (December 11, 1995)

Friends/Joey
  "The One with the Monkey" (Season 1, Episode 10) (December 15, 1994)
  "The One with Phoebe's Dad" (Season 2, Episode 9) (December 14, 1995)
  "The One Where Rachel Quits" (Season 3, Episode 10) (December 12, 1996)
  "The One with the Girl from Poughkeepsie" (Season 4, Episode 10) (December 18, 1997)
  "The One with the Inappropriate Sister" (Season 5, Episode 10)(December 17, 1998)
  "The One with the Routine" (Season 6, Episode 10) (December 16, 1999)
  "The One with All the Candy" (Season 7, Episode 9) (December 7, 2000)
  "The One with the Holiday Armadillo" (Season 7, Episode 10) (December 14, 2000)
  "The One With Ross' Step Forward" (Season 8, Episode 11) (December 13, 2001)
  "The One with Christmas in Tulsa" (Season 9, Episode 10) (December 12, 2002)Joey: "Joey and the Plot Twist" (Season 1, Episode 12) (December 9, 2004)
  "Joey and the Tijuana Trip" (Season 2, Episode 12) (December 15, 2005)
  "Joey and the Christmas Party" (Season 2, Episode 13) (December 15, 2005)
  "Joey and the Snowball Fight" (Season 2, Episode 14) (March 7, 2005)

Full House/Fuller House
  "Our Very First Christmas Show" (Season 2, Episode 9) (December 16, 1988)
  "A Very Tanner Christmas" (Season 6, Episode 12) (December 15, 1992)
  "Arrest Ye Merry Gentlemen" (Season 8, Episode 11) (December 13, 1994)
  "Nutcrackers" (Season 2, Episode 12) (December 9, 2016)
  "Oh, My Santa!" (Season 4, Episode 1) (December 14, 2018)

Futurama
  "Xmas Story" (Season 2, Episode 8) (December 19, 1999)
  "A Tale of Two Santas" (Season 4, Episode 2) (December 23, 2001)
  "The Futurama Holiday Spectacular" (Season 6, Episode 13) (November 21, 2010)

The Game
  "There's No Place Like Home" (Season 1, Episode 10) (December 11, 2006)
  "The Ghost of Derwin Past" (Season 2, Episode 10) (December 10, 2007)

The George Burns and Gracie Allen Show
  "Gracie's Christmas" (Season 1, Episode 6) (December 21, 1950)
  "Christmas with Mamie Kelly" (Season 2, Episode 7) (December 20, 1951)
  "Company for Christmas" (Season 6, Episode 12) (December 19, 1955)
  "Christmas in Jail" (Season 7, Episode 16) (December 24, 1956)
  "How to Wrap a Mink" (Season 8, Episode 13) (December 23, 1957)

George Lopez
  "Meet the Cuban Parents" (Season 2, Episode 11) (December 11, 2002)
  "Christmas Punch" (Season 3, Episode 12) (December 12, 2003)
  "A Clear and Presentless Danger" (Season 4, Episode 10) (December 14, 2004)
  "George Is Being Elfish and Christ-misses His Family" (Season 5, Episode 11) (December 14, 2005)

Gimme a Break!
  "A Kanisky Christmas" (Season 3, Episode 10) (December 22, 1983)
  "The Spirit of Christmas" (Season 4, Episode 13) (December 22, 1984)
  "Snippets" (Season 5, Episode 13) (December 14, 1985)
  "Christmas in New York" (Season 6, Episode 12) (December 10, 1986)

Girlfriends
  "You Better Watch Out" (Season 2, Episode 11) (December 17, 2001)
  "Santa v. Monica" (Season 3, Episode 11) (December 16, 2002)
  "Merry Ex-mas" (Season 4, Episode 11) (December 15, 2003)
  "All the Creatures Were Stirring" (Season 5, Episode 11) (December 13, 2004)
  "All God's Children" (Season 6, Episode 11) (December 12, 2005)
  "I'll Have a Blue Line Christmas" (Season 7, Episode 10) (December 11, 2006)
  "Deck the Halls with Bags and Folly" (Season 8, Episode 10) (December 10, 2007)

The Goldbergs
  "A Christmas Story" (Season 3, Episode 10) (December 9, 2015)
  "Han Ukkah Solo" (Season 4, Episode 10) (December 14, 2016)
  "We Didn't Start the Fire" (Season 5, Episode 10) (December 13, 2017)
  "Yippee Ki Yay Melon Farmer" (Season 6, Episode 10) (December 12, 2018)
  "It's a Wonderful Life" (Season 7, Episode 10) (December 11, 2019)
  "Hanukkah On the Seas" (Season 8, Episode 7) (December 2, 2020)
  "Worst Grinch Ever" (Season 10, Episode 10) (December 7, 2022)

The Golden Girls/The Golden Palace
  "'Twas the Nightmare Before Christmas" (Season 2, Episode 11) (December 20, 1986)
  "Have Yourself a Very Little Christmas" (Season 5, Episode 12) (December 16, 1989)
  "It's Beginning to Look a Lot (Less) Like Christmas" (Season 1, Episode 12) (1992)

Good Times
  "Sometimes There's No Bottom in the Bottle" (Season 2, Episode 13) (December 10, 1974)
  "Penny's Christmas" (Season 5, Episode 10) (December 21, 1977)
  "The Traveling Christmas" (Season 6, Episode 8) (December 20, 1978)

Grace Under Fire
  "Keeping Faith" (Season 1, Episode 11) (December 15, 1993)
  "The Holidays" (Season 2, Episode 12) (December 13, 1994)
  "Emmett, We Hardly Knew Ye" (Season 3, Episode 12) (December 20, 1995)
  "A Holly, Jolly Christmas" (Season 4, Episode 12) (December 18, 1996)
  "Mother Christmas" (Season 5, Episode 4) (December 16, 1997)

The Great North
 "Dip the Halls Adventure" (Season 2, Episode 10) (December 19, 2021)	
 "Xmas With the Skanks Adventure" (Season 3, Episode 10) (December 11, 2022)

Growing Pains
  "A Christmas Story" (Season 1, Episode 12) (December 10, 1985)
  "The Kid" (Season 2, Episode 9) (December 16, 1986)
  "It's Not Easy Being Green" (Season 7, Episode 13) (December 21, 1991)

Hangin' with Mr. Cooper
  "Miracle in Oaktown" (Season 1, Episode 10) (December 15, 1992)
  "Santa's Got a Brand New Bag" (Season 2, Episode 11) (December 10, 1993)
  "Christmas Show" (Season 3, Episode 12) (December 16, 1994)
  "Christmas '95" (Season 4, Episode 11) (December 15, 1995)

Happy Days
  "Guess Who's Coming to Christmas" (Season 2, Episode 11) (December 17, 1974)
  "Tell It to the Marines" (Season 3, Episode 15) (December 16, 1975)
  "Richie Branches Out" (Season 4, Episode 11) (December 7, 1976)
  "Christmas Time" (Season 6, Episode 16) (December 19, 1978)
  "White Christmas" (Season 8, Episode 6) (December 16, 1980)
  "All I Want for Christmas" (Season 10, Episode 10) (December 14, 1982)

Happy Endings
  "Grinches Be Crazy" (Season 2, Episode 9) (December 7, 2011)
  "No-Ho-Ho" (Season 3, Episode 7) (December 18, 2012)

Hazel
  "Hazel's Christmas Shopping" (Season 1, Episode 12) (December 21, 1961)
  "Just 86 Shopping Minutes to Christmas" (Season 4, Episode 15) (December 24, 1964)

Hearts Afire
  "Everyday's a Holiday" (Season 1, Episode 12) (December 21, 1992)
  "Blue Christmas" (Season 2, Episode 8) (December 15, 1993)
  "The Perfect Christmas" (Season 3, Episode 9) (December 10, 1994)

Hennesey
  "The Christmas Show" (Season 1, Episode 12) (December 21, 1959)
  "Santa Hits Harvey" (Season 3, Episode 13) (December 25, 1961)

Home Economics
  "Secret Santa List, $25 Limit" (Season 2, Episode 9) (2021)
  "Santa Suit Rental, $25 Per Day" (Season 3, Episode 10) (2022)

Home Improvement
  "Yule Better Watch Out" (Season 1, Episode 12) (December 17, 1991)
  "I'm Scheming of a White Christmas" (Season 2, Episode 12) (December 16, 1992)
  "'Twas the Blight Before Christmas" (Season 3, Episode 12) (December 15, 1993)
  "Some Like It Hot Rod" (Season 4, Episode 11) (December 6, 1994)
  "'Twas the Night Before Chaos" (Season 4, Episode 12) (December 13, 1994)
  "'Twas the Flight Before Christmas" (Season 5, Episode 12) (December 12, 1995)
  "No Place Like Home" (Season 6, Episode 12) (December 17, 1996)
  "Bright Christmas" (Season 7, Episode 11) (December 16, 1997)
  "Home for the Holidays" (Season 8, Episode 11) (December 8, 1998)

Hope & Faith
  "Silent Night, Opening Night" (Season 1, Episode 11) (December 12, 2003)
  "Aru-Bah Humbug" (Season 2, Episode 12) (December 17, 2004)
  "Christmas Time" (Season 3, Episode 11) (December 13, 2005)

HouseBroken
  "Who's Found Themselves in One of Those Magical Christmas Life Swap Switcheroos?" (Season 2, Episode 1) (2022)
  "Who's Having a Merry Trashmas?" (Season 2, Episode 2) (2022)

Tyler Perry's House of Payne
  "The Wench Who Saved Christmas" (Season 2, Episode 3) (December 5, 2007)
  "Oh, Christmas Payne" (Season 6, Episode 9) (December 9, 2009)

How I Met Your Mother
  "How Lily Stole Christmas" (Season 2, Episode 11) (December 11, 2006)
  "Little Minnesota" (Season 4, Episode 11) (December 15, 2008)
  "The Window" (Season 5, Episode 10) (December 7, 2009)
  "Last Cigarette Ever" (Season 5, Episode 11) (December 14, 2009)
  "False Positive" (Season 6, Episode 12) (December 13, 2010)
  "Symphony of Illumination" (Season 7, Episode 12) (December 5, 2011)
  "The Final Page" (Season 8, Episodes 11 & 12) (December 17, 2012)

The Hughleys
  "A Multi-Culti Christmas" (Season 1, Episode 12) (December 15, 1998)
  "Miracle on 135th and Avalon" (Season 2, Episode 11) (December 17, 1999)
  "I'm Dreaming of a Slight Christmas" (Season 4, Episode 12) (December 17, 2001)

In the House
  "Christmas Story" (Season 2, Episode 12) (December 11, 1995)
  "God Is in the House" (Season 4, Episode 13) (December 16, 1997)

The Jeffersons
  "The Christmas Wedding" (Season 3, Episode 12) (December 22, 1976)
  "984 W. 124th Street, Apt. 5C" (Season 4, Episode 15) (December 24, 1977)
  "George Finds a Father" (Season 5, Episode 12) December 20, 1978)
  "All I Want for Christmas" (Season 7, Episode 8) (December 21, 1980)
  "Father Christmas" (Season 10, Episode 10) (December 11, 1983)

Just Shoot Me!
  "Jesus, It's Christmas" (Season 2, Episode 9) (December 16, 1997)
  "How the Finch Stole Christmas" (Season 3, Episode 10) (December 15, 1998)
  "Christmas? Christmas!"  (Season 6, Episode 9) (December 13, 2001)

Kevin Can Wait
  "I'll Be Home for Christmas... Maybe" (Season 1, Episode 12) (December 12, 2016)
  "The Might've Before Christmas" (Season 2, Episode 12) (December 18, 2017)

The King of Queens
  "Noel Cowards" (Season 1, Episode 11) (December 14, 1998)
  "Net Prophets" (Season 2, Episode 12) (December 13, 1999)
  "Better Camera" (Season 3, Episode 11) (December 11, 2000)
  "Ovary Action" (Season 4, Episode 12) (December 17, 2001)
  "Mentalo Case" (Season 5, Episode 11) (December 16, 2002)
  "Santa Claustrophobia" (Season 6, Episode 11) (December 17, 2003)
  "Silent Mite" (Season 7, Episode 7) (December 15, 2004)
  "Baker's Doesn't" (Season 8, Episode 11) (December 19, 2005)

King of the Hill
  "The Unbearable Blindness of Laying" (Season 2, Episode 11) (December 21, 1997)
  "Pretty, Pretty Dresses" (Season 3, Episode 9) (December 15, 1998)
  "Hillennium" (Season 4, Episode 10) (December 19, 1999)
  "'Twas the Nut Before Christmas" (Season 5, Episode 8) (December 17, 2000)
  "The Father, the Son, and J.C." (Season 6. Episode 4) (December 16, 2001)
  "Livin' on Reds, Vitamin C and Propane" (Season 8, Episode 7) (December 14, 2003)
  "Ms. Wakefield" (Season 9, Episode 2) (December 19, 2004)

The Last Man on Earth
  "Secret Santa" (Season 2, Episode 9) (December 6, 2015)
  "Silent Night" (Season 2, Episode 10) (December 13, 2015)

Last Man Standing
  "Last Christmas Standing" (Season 1, Episode 10) (December 6, 2011)
  "Putting a Hit on Christmas" (Season 2, Episode 7) (December 14, 2012)
  "Elfie" (Season 3, Episode 11) (December 13, 2013)
  "Wedding Planning" (Season 4, Episode 11) (December 12, 2014)
  "Gift of the Wise Man" (Season 5, Episode 11) (December 11, 2015)
  "My Name Is Rob" (Season 6, Episode 11) (December 16, 2016)
  "The Gift of the Mike Guy" (Season 7, Episode 9) (December 14, 2018)

Laverne & Shirley
  "Oh Hear the Angels' Voices" (Season 2, Episode 10) (December 21, 1976)
  "O Come All Ye Bums" (Season 4, Episode 14) (December 19, 1978)
  "Friendly Persuasion" (Season 7, Episode 9) (December 15, 1981)

The League
  "The Usual Bet" (Season 1, Episode 5) (2009)
  "Kegel the Elf" (Season 2, Episode 12) (2010)
  "A Krampus Carol" (Season 4, Episode 12) (2012)

Less Than Perfect
  "One Office Party Too Many" (Season 1, Episode 10) (December 10, 2002)
  "Santa Claude" (Season 2, Episode 12) (December 16, 2003)
  "Claude's 15 Minutes of Christmas" (Season 3, Episode 11) (December 17, 2004)

Life in Pieces
  "College Stealing Santa Caroling" (Season 1, Episode 11) (December 17, 2015)
  "Window Vanity Dress Grace" (Season 2, Episode 8) (December 15, 2016)
  "The Twelve Shorts of Christmas" (Season 3, Episode 8) (December 21, 2017)

Life with Bonnie
  "Christmastime in the City" (Season 1, Episode 12) (December 10, 2002)
  "It's a Wonderful Job" (Season 2, Episode 11) (December 12, 2003)

Living Single
  "Living Kringle" (Season 1, Episode 15) (December 19, 1993)
  "Let It Snow, Let It Snow, Let It Snow...Dammit" (Season 3, Episode 13) (December 14, 1995)
  "Doctor in the House" (Season 4, Episode 12) (December 19, 1996)

Love That Girl!
  "Twas the Storm Before Christmas" (Season 3, Episode 11) (December 19, 2011)
  "Happy Hold Up Day" (Season 4, Episode 9) (December 6, 2013)

The Love Boat
  "Lonely at the Top/Divorce Me, Please/Silent Night" (Season 1, Episode 11) (December 10, 1977)
  "The Captain's Bird/That's My Dad/Captive Audience" (Season 4, Episode 11) (December 20, 1980)
  "A Christmas Presence" (Season 6, Episode 13) (December 18, 1982)
  "Santa, Santa, Santa/Another Dog-Gone Christmas/Noel's Christmas Carol" (Season 8, Episode 16) (December 15, 1984)
  "The Christmas Cruise" (Season 10, Episodes 2, 3, & 4) (December 25, 1986)

The Lucy Show
  "Together for Christmas" (Season 1, Episode 13) (December 24, 1962)
  "Lucy the Choirmaster" (Season 4, Episode 13) (December 13, 1965)

Make Room for Daddy / The Danny Thomas Show
  "Christmas" (Season 1, Episode 13) (December 22, 1953)
  "Christmas and Clowns" (Season 4, Episode 13) (December 24, 1956)
  "Christmas Story" (Season 11, Episode 12) (December 23, 1963)

Malcolm in the Middle
  "Christmas" (Season 3, Episode 7) (December 16, 2001)
  "Christmas Trees" (Season 5, Episode 7) (December 14, 2003)
  "Hal's Christmas Gift" (Season 6, Episode 6) (December 19, 2004)

Mama's Family
  "Santa Mama" (Season 3, Episode 13) (December 20, 1986)
  "Mama Gets Goosed" (Season 6, Episode 14) (December 23, 1989)

The Many Loves of Dobie Gillis
  "Deck the Halls" (Season 1, Episode 12) (December 22, 1959)
  "Jangle Bells" (Season 2, Episode 10) (December 20, 1960)
  "Have Reindeer, Will Travel" (Season 3, Episode 11) (December 19, 1961)
  "Will the Real Santa Claus Please Come Down the Chimney?" (Season 4, Episode 13) (December 19, 1962)

Married... With Children
  "You Better Watch Out" (Season 2, Episode 13) (December 20, 1987)
  "It's a Bundyful Life" (Season 4, Episodes 11 & 12) (December 17, 1989)
  "Christmas" (Season 7, Episode 12) (December 20, 1992)
  "The Worst Noel" (Season 8, Episode 13) (December 19, 1993)
  "I Can't Believe It's Butter" (Season 10, Episode 14) (December 17, 1995)
  "God Help Ye Merry Bundymen" (Season 11, Episode 8) (December 22, 1996)

The Mary Tyler Moore Show
  "Christmas and the Hard Luck Kid II" (Season 1, Episode 14) (December 19, 1970)
  "Not a Christmas Story" (Season 5, Episode 9) (November 9, 1974)

Martin
  "I Saw Gina Kissing Santa Claus" (Season 1, Episode 15) (December 17, 1992)
  "Holiday Blues" (Season 2, Episode 15) (December 19, 1993)
  "Go Tell It on the Martin" (Season 3, Episode 13) (December 15, 1994)
  "Swing Thing" (Season 4, Episode 13)(December 17, 1995)
  "Scrooge" (Season 5, Episode 10) (December 19, 1996)

Maude
  "The Office Party" (Season 2, Episode 14) (December 18, 1973)
  "The Christmas Party" (Season 4, Episode 14) (December 22, 1975)
  "Walter's Christmas Gift" (Season 5, Episode 13) (December 20, 1976)
  "Maude's Christmas Surprise" (Season 6, Episode 11) (December 19, 1977)

Meet Mr. McNutley / The Ray Milland Show
  "The Christmas Story" (Season 1, Episode 15) (December 24, 1953)
  "Christmas Story" (Season 2, Episode 15) (December 23, 1954)

Melissa & Joey
  "A New Kind of Christmas" (Season 3, Episode 16) (December 11, 2013)
  "A Melanie & Josiah Christmas" (Season 4, Episode 2) (December 10, 2014)

Men Behaving Badly (American TV series)
  "Christmas" (Season 1, Episode 10) (December 18, 1996)
  "The Gift of Jami" (Season 2, Episode 6) (December 17, 1997)

The Middle
  "Christmas" (Season 1, Episode 10) (December 9, 2009)
  "A Simple Christmas" (Season 2, Episode 10) (December 8, 2010)
  "A Christmas Gift" (Season 3, Episode 11) (December 7, 2011)
  "Christmas Help" (Season 4, Episode 9) (December 5, 2012)
  "The Christmas Tree" (Season 5, Episode 9) (December 11, 2013)
  "The Christmas Wall" (Season 6, Episode 9) (December 10, 2014)
  "Not So Silent Night" (Season 7, Episode 10) (December 9, 2015)
  "A Very Marry Christmas" (Season 8, Episode 9) (December 13, 2016)
  "The Christmas Miracle" (Season 9, Episode 10) (December 12, 2017)

The Millers
  "Carols Parents Are Coming to Town" (Season 1, Episode 10) (December 12, 2013)
  "Highway To The Manger Zone" (Season 2, Episode 9) (July 18, 2015)

Mike & Molly
  "First Christmas" (Season 1, Episode 12) (December 13, 2010)
  "Christmas Break" (Season 2, Episode 11) (December 12, 2011)
  "Karaoke Christmas" (Season 3, Episode 10) (December 17, 2012)
  "Tis the Season to Be Molly" (Season 5, Episode 3) (December 22, 2014)

The Mindy Project
  "Josh and Mindy's Christmas Party" (Season 1, Episode 9) (December 11, 2012)
  "Christmas Party Sex Trap" (Season 2, Episode 11) (December 3, 2013)
  "Christmas" (Season 3, Episode 11) (December 9, 2014)
  "When Mindy Met Danny" (Season 4, Episode 13) (December 8, 2015)

Mister Peepers
  Season 3, Episode 14 (December 13, 1953) 
  Season 3, Episode 15 (December 20, 1953) 
  Season 4, Episode 11 (December 19, 1954)

Modern Family
  "Undeck the Halls" (Season 1, Episode 10) (December 9, 2009)
  "Express Christmas" (Season 3, Episode 10) (December 7, 2011)
  "The Old Man & the Tree" (Season 5, Episode 10) (December 11, 2013)
  "White Christmas" (Season 7, Episode 9) (December 9, 2015)
  "Snow Ball" (Season 8, Episode 9) (December 14, 2016)
  "Stuck in a Moment" (Season 10, Episode 10) (December 12, 2018)
  "The Last Christmas" (Season 11, Episode 9) (December 11, 2019)

Mom
  "Horny-Goggles and a Catered Intervention" (Season 3, Episode 6) (December 17, 2015)
  "An Epi-Pen and a Security Cat" (Season 5, Episode 8) (December 21, 2017)
  "Foot Powder and Five Feet of Vodka" (Season 6, Episode 11) (December 13, 2018)
  "Higgledy-Piggledy and a Cat Show" (Season 7, Episode 10) (December 12, 2019)

Mr. Belvedere
  "Christmas Story" (Season 4, Episode 8) (December 18, 1987)
  "A Happy Guys' Christmas" (Season 6, Episode 11) (December 16, 1989)

Murphy Brown
  "Murphy's Pony" (Season 1, Episode 5) (December 11, 1988)
  "Jingle Hell, Jingle Hell, Jingle All the Way" (Season 3, Episode 11) (December 17, 1990)
  "I'm Dreaming of a Brown Christmas" (Season 5, Episode 12) (December 14, 1992)
  "Brown in Toyland" (Season 7, Episode 12) (December 12, 1994)

My Name Is Earl
  "White Lie Christmas" (Season 1, Episode 10) (December 6, 2005)
  "Born a Gamblin' Man" (Season 2, Episode 9) (November 30, 2006)
  "Bad Earl" (Season 3, Episode 13) (December 13, 2007)
  "Orphan Earl" (Season 4, Episode 13) (December 11, 2008)

My Two Dads
  Tis the Season" (Season 1, Episode 11) (December 20, 1987)
  "I'm Dreaming of a Holiday Episode" (Season 3, Episode 10) (December 20, 1989)

Mystery Science Theater 3000
  "Santa Claus Conquers the Martians" (Season 3, Episode 21) (December 21, 1991)
  "Santa Claus" (Season 5, Episode 21) (December 24, 1993)
  "The Christmas That Almost Wasn't" (Season 11, Episode 13) (April 14, 2017)
  "The Christmas Dragon" (Season 13, Episode 13) (December 16, 2022)

The Nanny
  "Christmas Episode" (Season 1, Episode 8) (December 22, 1993)
  "Oy to the World" (Season 3, Episode 14) (December 18, 1995)
  "The Hanukkah Story" (Season 6, Episode 10) (December 16, 1998)

The Neighbors
  "Merry Crap-Mas" (Season 1, Episode 9) (December 5, 2012)
  "A Christmas Story" (Season 2, Episode 11) (December 13, 2013)

New Girl
  "The 23rd" (Season 1, Episode 9) (December 13, 2011)
  "Santa" (Season 2, Episode 11) (December 11, 2012)
  "LAXmas" (Season 4, Episode 11) (December 9, 2014)
  "Christmas Eve Eve" (Season 6, Episode 10) (December 13, 2016)

Newhart
  "No Room at the Inn" (Season 1, Episode 9) (December 20, 1982)
  "The Prodigal Darryl" (Season 3, Episode 21) (May 6, 1985)

NewsRadio
  "Xmas Story" (Season 2, Episode 10) (December 19, 1995)
  "Christmas" (Season 3, Episode 10) (December 18, 1996)
  "Stupid Holiday Charity Talent Show" (Season 4, Episode 8) (December 16, 1997)

Night Court
  "Santa Goes Downtown" (Season 1, Episode 2) (January 11, 1984)
  "Let It Snow" (Season 5, Episode 11) (December 17, 1987)
  "The Night Court Before Christmas" (Season 6, Episode 9) (December 21, 1988) 
  "Santa on the Lam" (Season 9, Episode 11) (December 11, 1991)

The Office
  "Christmas Party" (Season 2, Episode 10) (December 6, 2005)
  "A Benihana Christmas" (Season 3, Episodes 10 & 11) (December 14, 2006)
  "Moroccan Christmas" (Season 5, Episode 11) (December 11, 2008)
  "Secret Santa" (Season 6, Episode 13) (December 10, 2009)
  "Classy Christmas" (Season 7, Episodes 11 & 12) (December 9, 2010)
  "Christmas Wishes" (Season 8, Episode 10) (December 8, 2011)
  "Dwight Christmas" (Season 9, Episode 9) (December 6, 2012)

One Day at a Time
  "Girl Talk" (Season 4, Episode 13) (December 25, 1978)
  "Not a Creature Was Staying" (Season 9, Episode 9) (December 25, 1983)

One on One
  "Santa Baby" (Season 1, Episode 12) (December 17, 2001)
  "Everybody Loves Whom?" (Season 2, Episode 11) (December 16, 2002)
  "It's a Miserable Life" (Season 3, Episode 11) (December 16, 2003)
  "It's Beginning to Look a Lot Like...Venice?" (Season 5, Episode 11) (December 12, 2005)

Our Miss Brooks
  "Christmas Show 1952" (Season 1, Episode 13) (December 26, 1952)
  "The Magic Tree" (Season 2, Episode 12) (December 25, 1953)
  "Music Box Revue" (Season 4, Episode 11)(December 16, 1955)

Parks and Recreation
  "Christmas Scandal" (Season 2, Episode 12) (December 10, 2009)
  "Citizen Knope" (Season 4, Episode 10) (December 8, 2011)
  "Ron and Diane" (Season 5, Episode 9) (December 6, 2012)

Perfect Strangers
  "A Christmas Story" (Season 2, Episode 11) (December 17, 1986)
  "The Gift of the Mypiot" (Season 4, Episode 9) (December 16, 1988)

Petticoat Junction
  "Cannonball Christmas" (Season 1, Episode 14) (December 24, 1963)
  "The Santa Claus Special" (Season 4, Episode 13) (December 20, 1966)

Punky Brewster
  "Yes, Punky, There Is a Santa Claus" (Season 1, Episodes 12 & 13) (December 16, 1984)
  "Christmas Shoplifting" (Season 2, Episode 13) (December 15, 1985)
  "Christmas Hero" (Season 4, Episode 7) (May 5, 1988)

Raising Hope
  "Toy Story" (Season 1, Episode 11) (December 7, 2010)
  "It's a Hopeful Life" (Season 2, Episode 10) (December 13, 2011)
  "Last Christmas" (Season 3, Episode 10) (December 11, 2012)
  "The Chance Who Stole Christmas" (Season 4, Episode 9) (December 13, 2013)

Rodney
  "It's Up, It's Good" (Season 1, Episode 10) (December 7, 2004)
  "O Christmas Trees" (Season 2, Episode 7) (December 20, 2005)

Roseanne/The Conners
  "Santa Claus" (Season 4, Episode 12) (December 24, 1991)
  "It's No Place Like Home for the Holidays" (Season 5, Episode 12) (December 15, 1992)
  "White Trash Christmas" (Season 6, Episode 12) (December 14, 1993)
  "The Parenting Trap" (Season 7, Episode 12) (December 14, 1994)
  "December Bride" (Season 8, Episode 11) (December 12, 1995)
  "Home for the Holidays" (Season 9, Episode 12) (December 17, 1996)
  "Smoking Penguins and Santa on Santa Action" (Season 2, Episode 9) (December 10, 2019)
  "Yard Sale, Phone Fail, And a College Betrayal" (Season 4, Episode 8) (December 1, 2021)
  "The Dog Days of Christmas" (Season 5, Episode 10) (December 7, 2022)

Sabrina the Teenage Witch
  "A Girl and Her Cat" (Season 1, Episode 11) (December 13, 1996)
  "Sabrina Claus" (Season 2, Episode 12) (December 19, 1997)
  "Christmas Amnesia" (Season 3, Episode 11) (December 11, 1998)
  "Sabrina, Nipping at Your Nose" (Season 4, Episode 12) (December 17, 1999)
  "Sabrina's Perfect Christmas" (Season 5, Episode 10) (December 15, 2000)
  "It's a Hot, Hot, Hot, Hot Christmas" (Season 7, Episode 9) (December 6, 2002)

Saved by the Bell/Saved by the Bell: The New Class
  "Home for Christmas" (Season 3, Episode 24–25) (1991)
  "Christmas in July" (Season 2, Episode 12) (1994)
  "The Christmas Gift" (Season 3, Episode 25) (1995)
  "Fire at the Max" (Season 4, Episode 25) (1996)
  "Seasons Greed-ings" (Season 6, Episode 13) (1998)

Scrubs
  "My Own Personal Jesus" (Season 1, Episode 11) (December 11, 2001)
  "My Monster" (Season 2, Episode 10) (December 12, 2002)
  "My Best Moment" (Season 4, Episode 12) (December 7, 2004)

Seinfeld
  "The Red Dot" (Season 3, Episode 12) (December 11, 1991)
  "The Pick" (Season 4, Episode 12) (December 16, 1992)
  "The Race" (Season 6, Episode 10) (December 15, 1994)
  "The Gum" (Season 7, Episode 10) (December 14, 1995)
  "The Andrea Doria" (Season 8, Episode 10) (December 19, 1996)
  "The Strike" (Season 9, Episode 10) (December 18, 1997)

Silver Spoons
  "The Best Christmas Ever" (Season 1, Episode 13) (December 18, 1982)
  "'Twas the Night Before Christmas" (Season 3, Episode 11) (December 16, 1984)

The Simpsons
 The Tracey Ullman Show short: "Simpson Christmas" (December 18, 1988)
  "Simpsons Roasting on an Open Fire" (Season 1, Episode 1) (December 17, 1989)
  "Marge Be Not Proud" (Season 7, Episode 11) (December 17, 1995)
  "Miracle on Evergreen Terrace" (Season 9, Episode 10) (December 21, 1997)
  "Grift of the Magi" (Season 11, Episode 9) (December 19, 1999)
  "Skinner's Sense of Snow" (Season 12, Episode 8) (December 17, 2000)
  "She of Little Faith" (Season 13, Episode 6) (December 16, 2001)
  'Tis the Fifteenth Season" (Season 15, Episode 7) (December 14, 2003)
  "Simpsons Christmas Stories" (Season 17, Episode 9) (December 18, 2005)
  "Kill Gil, Volumes I & II" (Season 18, Episode 9) (December 17, 2006)
  "The Fight Before Christmas" (Season 22, Episode 8) (December 5, 2010)
  "Holidays of Future Passed" (Season 23, Episode 9) (December 11, 2011)
  "White Christmas Blues" (Season 25, Episode 8) (December 15, 2013)
  "I Won't Be Home for Christmas" (Season 26, Episode 9) (December 7, 2014)
  "The Nightmare After Krustmas"  (Season 28, Episode 10) (December 11, 2016)
  "Gone Boy" (Season 29, Episode 9) (December 10, 2017)
  'Tis the 30th Season" (Season 30, Episode 10) (December 9, 2018)
  "Bobby, It's Cold Outside" (Season 31, Episode 10) (December 15, 2019)
  "The Way of the Dog" (Season 31, Episode 22) (May 17, 2020)
  "A Springfield Summer Christmas for Christmas" (Season 32, Episode 10) (December 13, 2020)
  "Manger Things" (Season 32, Episode 16) (March 21, 2021)

Single Parents
  "The Magic Box" (Season 1, Episode 10) (December 12, 2018)
  "Good Holidays to You" (Season 2, Episode 10) (December 11, 2019)

South Park
  "Mr. Hankey, the Christmas Poo" (Season 1, Episode 9) (December 17, 1997)
  "Merry Christmas, Charlie Manson!" (Season 2, Episode 16) (December 9, 1998)
  "Mr. Hankey's Christmas Classics" (Season 3, Episode 15) (December 1, 1999)
  "A Very Crappy Christmas" (Season 4, Episode 17) (December 20, 2000)
  "Red Sleigh Down" (Season 6, Episode 17) (December 11, 2002)
  "It's Christmas in Canada" (Season 7, Episode 15) (December 17, 2003)
  "Woodland Critter Christmas" (Season 8, Episode 14) (December 15, 2004)
  "HappyHolograms" (Season 18, Episode 10) (December 10, 2014)
  "Bike Parade" (Season 22, Episode 10) (December 12, 2018)
  "Christmas Snow" (Season 23, Episode 10) (December 11, 2019)

Speechless
  "C-h-o-Choir" (Season 1, Episode 10) (December 14, 2016)
  "S-i-Silent Night" (Season 2, Episode 10) (December 13, 2017)
  "J-i-Jingle T-H-Thon" (Season 3, Episode 8) (December 14, 2018)

Spin City
  "Miracle Near 34th Street" (Season 2, Episode 12) (December 17, 1997)
  "Monkey Business" (Season 3, Episode 12) (December 15, 1998)
  "My Dinner with Caitlin" (a.k.a. "Christmas 1999") (Season 4, Episode 12) (December 21, 1999)
  "Toy Story" (Season 5, Episode 10) (December 20, 2000)
  "An Office and a Gentleman" (Season 6, Episode 12) (December 11, 2001)

Step by Step
  "Christmas Story" (Season 3, Episode 11) (December 10, 1993)
  "I'll Be Home for Christmas" (Season 4, Episode 12) (December 16, 1994)
  "The Fight Before Christmas" (Season 5, Episode 11) (December 15, 1995)
  "Too Many Santas" (Season 7, Episode 10) (December 19, 1997)

Still Standing
  "Still Christmas" (Season 2, Episode 10) (December 15, 2003)
  "Still Avoiding Christmas" (Season 4, Episode 8) (December 14, 2005)

Suburgatory
  "The Nutcracker" (Season 1, Episode 9) (December 7, 2011)
  "Krampus" (Season 2, Episode 7) (December 5, 2012)

Suddenly Susan
  "The Walk-Out" (Season 1, Episode 11) (December 19, 1996)
  "Yule Never Know" (Season 2, Episode 11) (December 15, 1997)
  "Merry Ex-mas" (Season 3, Episode 11) (December 14, 1998)

Superstore
  "Seasonal Help" (Season 2, Episode 9) (November 10, 2016)
  "Christmas Eve" (Season 3, Episode 7) (December 5, 2017)
  "Managers' Conference" (Season 4, Episode 8) (December 6, 2018)
  "Negotiations" (Season 5, Episode 10) (December 12, 2019)

Taxi
  "A Full House for Christmas" (Season 1, Episode 13) (December 12, 1978)
  "Get Me Through the Holidays" (Season 5, Episode 12) (December 16, 1982)

That Girl
  "Christmas and the Hard-Luck Kid" (Season 1, Episode 16) (December 22, 1966)
  "'Twas the Night Before Christmas, You're Under Arrest" (Season 2, Episode 15) (December 21, 1967)

That '70s Show
  "The Best Christmas Ever" (Season 1, Episode 12) (December 13, 1998)
  "Hyde's Christmas Rager" (Season 3, Episode 9) (December 19, 2000)
  "An Eric Forman Christmas" (Season 4, Episode 12) (December 18, 2001)
  "Christmas" (Season 6, Episode 7) (December 17, 2003)
  "Winter" (Season 7, Episode 11) (December 15, 2004)

Titus
  "The Last Noelle" (Season 2, Episode 9) (December 19, 2000)
  "Houseboat" (Season 3, Episode 6) (December 19, 2001)

Topper
  "A Christmas Carol" (Season 1, Episode 12) (December 25, 1953)
  "Topper's Quiet Christmas" (Season 2, Episode 24) (December 24, 1954)

True Colors
  "Christmas Show '90" (Season 1, Episode 14) (December 23, 1990)
  "Broken Home: Parts 1 & 2" (Season 2, Episodes 11 & 12) (December 15 & 22, 1991)

Two and a Half Men
  "Santa's Village of the Damned" (Season 3, Episode 11) (December 19, 2005)
  "Walnuts and Demerol" (Season 4, Episode 11) (December 11, 2006)
  "Warning, It's Dirty" (Season 7, Episode 11) (December 14, 2009)
  "One False Move, Zimbabwe!" (Season 9, Episode 12) (December 12, 2011)
  "Give Santa a Tail-Hole" (Season 10, Episode 11) (December 13, 2012)
  "On Vodka, on Soda, on Blender, on Mixer!" (Season 11, Episode 10) (December 12, 2013)
  "Family, Bublé, Deep-Fried Turkey" (Season 12, Episode 8) (December 18, 2014)

Up All Night
  "First Christmas" (Season 1, Episode 11) (December 7, 2011)
  "First Snow" (Season 2, Episode 10) (December 13, 2012)

Veronica's Closet
  "Veronica's Christmas Song" (Season 1, Episode 10) (December 18, 1997)
  "Veronica's Secret Santa" (Season 2, Episode 10) (December 10, 1998)

The Wayans Bros.
  "Psycho Santa" (Season 2, Episode 12) (December 20, 1995)
  "A Country Christmas" (Season 5, Episode 11) (December 17, 1998)

Webster
  "The Man in the Red Flannel Suit" (Season 4, Episode 11) (December 12, 1986)
  "Simple Gifts" (Season 5, Episode 12) (December 14, 1987)

Welcome Back, Kotter
  "Hark, the Sweatkings" (Season 2, Episode 12) (December 23, 1976)
  "A Sweathog Christmas Special" (Season 3, Episode 15) (December 15, 1977)
  "A Winter's Coat Tale" (Season 4, Episode 13) (December 16, 1978)

Welcome to Flatch
  "Merry Flatchmas" (Season 1, Episode 14) (May 26, 2022)
  "O Come, All Ye Flatchful (Season 2, Episode 9) (December 8, 2022)

What's Happening!! / What's Happening Now!!
  "Christmas" (Season 1, Episode 9) (December 11, 1976)
  "I'll Be Homeless for Christmas" (Season 2, Episode 13) (December 15, 1986)
  "Positive Identification" (Season 3, Episode 10) (December 21, 1978)

Where's Raymond? / The Ray Bolger Show
  "Christmas" (Season 1, Episode 12) (December 24, 1953)
  "Father for a Day" (Season 2, Episode 15) (December 24, 1954)

Who's the Boss?
  "Requiem" (Season 1, Episode 10) (December 18, 1984)
  "The Christmas Card" (Season 3, Episode 11) (December 16, 1986)
  "A Spirited Christmas" (Season 5, Episode 8) (December 20, 1988)

Will & Grace
  "Jingle Balls" (Season 4, Episode 12) (December 13, 2001)
  "All About Christmas Eve" (Season 5, Episode 11) (December 12, 2002)
  "Fanilow" (Season 6, Episode 10) (December 11, 2003)
  "Christmas Break" (Season 7, Episode 12) (December 9, 2004)
  "A Little Christmas Queer" (Season 8, Episode 9) (December 8, 2005)
  "A Gay Olde Christmas" (Season 9, Episode 7) (December 5, 2017)

Wings
  "A Terminal Christmas" (Season 2, Episode 11) (December 21, 1990)
  "The Customer's Usually Right" (Season 4, Episode 10) (December 17, 1992)
  "Happy Holidays" (Season 5, Episode 11) (December 16, 1993)
  "Insanity Claus" (Season 6, Episode 11) (December 13, 1994)
  "Twas the Heist Before Christmas" (Season 7, Episode 10) (December 19, 1995)
  "All About Christmas Eve" (Season 8, Episode 11) (December 18, 1996)

WKRP in Cincinnati
  "Jennifer's Home for Christmas" (Season 2, Episode 11) (December 17, 1979)
  "Bah, Humbug" (Season 3, Episode 7) (December 6, 1980)

Working
  "Medieval Christmas" (Season 1, Episode 17) (December 17, 1997)
  "The Christmas Party" (Season 2, Episode 9) (December 22, 1998)

Young Rock
 "A Christmas Peril" (Season 1, Episode 12) (2021)
 "Dwanta Claus" (Season 2, Episode 6) (2022)

Children's series

Live-action
 Big Bad Beetleborgs (Season 1, Episode 33): Christmas Bells and Phantom's Spells (1996)
 Bozo the Clown: Bozo, Gar and Ray: WGN TV Classics (2005, compilation of clips from 1960 to 2001)
 The Big Comfy Couch: "Comfy And Joy" (Season 4, Episode 13) (1995)
 Fraggle Rock: "The Bells of Fraggle Rock" (Season 4, Episode 1) (1984)
 Fraggle Rock: Back to the Rock: "Night of the Lights Holiday Special" (Season 1, Episode 14) (2022)
 The Hardy Boys/Nancy Drew Mysteries: Will the Real Santa Claus...?" (Season 2, Episode 12) (1977)Masked Rider: "Ferbus' First Christmas" (Season 1, Episode 12) (1995)
 Pee-wee's Playhouse Christmas Special (1988)
 Shining Time Station: 'Tis A Gift (1990)
 Shirley Temple's Storybook: "Babes in Toyland" (Season 2, Episode 14) (1960)
 VR Troopers: "Santa's Secret Trooper" (Season 2, Episode 27) (1995)

Lassie
 Lassie: "The Christmas Story 1958" (Season 5, Episode 16) (1958)
 Lassie: "The Christmas Story 1960" (Season 7, Episode 15) (1960)
 Lassie: "Yochim's Christmas" (Season 8, Episode 15) (1961)
 Lassie: "Lassie's Gift of Love" (Season 10, Episode 11-12) (1963)
 Lassie: "The Little Christmas Tree" (Season 11, Episode 15) (1964)
 Lassie: "The Greatest Gift" (Season 13, Episode 14) (1966)
 Lassie: "Miracle of the Dove" (Season 14, Episode 15) (1967)
 Lassie: "The Blessing" (Season 16, Episode 12) (1969)

Cartoon Network/Discovery Family
 The Aquabats! Super Show!: 
 "Christmas With The Aquabats!" (Season 2, Episode 6) (2013)
 The High Fructose Adventures of Annoying Orange:
 "Orange Carol" (Season 1, Episode 20) (2012)
 "Fruitsy the Snowfruit" (Season 2, Episode 21) (2013)
 R.L. Stine's The Haunting Hour:
 "A Creature Was Stirring" (Season 1, Episode 3) (2010)
 "Goodwill Toward Men" (Season 4, Episode 10) (2014)
 Spooksville:
 "The No-Ones" (Season 1, Episode 10) (2013)

Disney Channel, Disney XD and Playhouse Disney
 Doraemon: Gadget Cat from the Future:"What Day is it Today" (Season 1, Episode 25B) (2014)"Snowkid on the Block" (Season 2, Episode 12B) (2015)
 Imagination Movers: 
 "Present Problem" (Season 1, Episode 21) (2008)
 "Happy Ha Ha Holidays!" (Season 2, Episode 9) (2009) 
 "A Little Elf Esteem" (Season 3, Episode 10) (2011)

Nickelodeon/Nick Jr.
 Allegra's Window: 
  "Waiting for Grandma" (Season 1, Episode 17) (1994)
  "Mr. Cook's Christmas" (Season 3, Episode 12) (1996)
 Blue's Clues:
  "A Snowy Day" (Season 1, Episode 10) (1996)
  "Blue's Big Holiday" (Season 3, Episode 9) (1999)
  "Blue's First Holiday" (Season 5, Episode 36) (2003)
 Blue's Clues & You! : 
  "Blue's Night Before Christmas" (Season 2, Episode 8) (2020)
  "A Blue's Clues Festival of Lights" (Season 3, Episode 4) (2021)
  "Blue's Snowy Day Surprise" (Season 3, Episode 5) (2021)
 Blue's Room: "Holiday Wishes" (Season 1, Episode 3) (2004)
 Eureeka's Castle: "Christmas at Eureeka's" (Season 1, Episode 20) (1989)
 The Fresh Beat Band: "Fresh Beats in Toyland" (Season 2, Episode 7) (2010)
 Gullah Gullah Island: "A Gullah Gullah Christmas" (Season 2, Episode 19) (1996)
 LazyTown: 
  "Surprise Santa" (Season 1, Episode 29) (2005)
  "The Holiday Spirit" (Season 3, Episode 13) (2013)
 Ryan's Mystery Playdate: "Ryan's Merry Playdate" (Season 2, Episode 10) (2019)
 The Wubbulous World of Dr. Seuss: "Mrs. Zabarelli's Holiday Baton" (Season 1, Episode 8) (1996)
 Yo Gabba Gabba!: 
  "Christmas" (Season 1, Episode 18) (2007)
  "A Very Awesome Christmas" (Season 4, Episode 3) (2011)

Animation

Cartoon Network/Boomerang/Discovery Family
 Adventure Time:
  "Holly Jolly Secrets" (Season 3, Episodes 19-20) (2011)
  "The More You Moe, The Moe You Know" (Season 7, Episode 14) (2015)
 The Adventures of Chuck and Friends:
  "Up All Night/Boomer the Snowplow" (Season 1, Episode 8) (2010)
  "The Regifters" (Season 2, Episode 12) (2011)
 Almost Naked Animals:
  "The Ear Wax Elf" (Season 1, Episode 5) (2011)
  "The Perfect Gift/Home for the Howiedays" (Season 1, Episode 26) (2011)
 The Amazing World of Gumball:  "Christmas" (Season 2, Episode 15) (2012)
  "The Lie" (Season 3, Episode 26) (2014)
 Apple & Onion:
  "Christmas Spirit" (Season 2, Episode 10) (2020)
  "Win It or Bin It" (Season 2, Episode 36) (2021)
  "World Cup" (Season 2, Episode 37) (2021)
 Atomic Betty:
  "Jingle Brawl / Toy Storyia" (Season 1, Episode 25) (2005)
  "The No-L 9" (Season 2, Episode 27) (2005)
 Batman: The Brave and the Bold:
  "Invasion of the Secret Santas!" (Season 1, Episode 4) (2008)
 Ben 10 (2005 TV series):
  "Merry Christmas" (Season 3, Episode 4) (2006)
 Ben 10 (2016 TV series):
  "The Feels" (Season 2, Episode 28) (2018)
 Camp Lazlo:
  "Kamp Kringle" (Season 5, Episode 9) (2007)
 Care Bears: Welcome to Care-a-Lot:
  "Holiday Hics" (Season 1, Episode 12) (2012)
  "Holi-Stage" (Season 1, Episode 24) (2012)
 Casper's Scare School: 
  "Merry Scary Christmas" (Season 1, Episode 11) (2009)
 Chowder:
  "Hey, Hey It's Knishmas!" (Season 2, Episode 7) (2008)
 Clarence:
  "Merry Moochmas" (Season 2, Episode 37) (2016)
 Class of 3000: 
  "The Class of 3000 Christmas Special" (Season 2, Episode 9-10) (2007)
 Code Lyoko:
  "Cold War" (Season 2, Episode 19) (2005)
  "Distant Memory" (Season 4, Episode 16) (2007)
 Codename: Kids Next Door:
  "Operation: N.A.U.G.H.T.Y." (Season 5, Episode 2) (2005)
 Courage the Cowardly Dog:
  "The Nutcracker" (Season 4, Episode 1 Part 2) (2002)
 Craig of the Creek: 
  "Locked Out Cold" (Season 4, Episode 2) (2021)
 Dan Vs.: 
  "The Mall Santa" (Season 2, Episode 2) (2011)
 Dexter's Laboratory:
  "Dexter vs. Santa's Claws" (Season 4, Episode 5c) (1998)
  "A Mom Cartoon" (Season 3, Episode 13b) (2002)
 Dorothy and the Wizard of Oz:
  "Dorothy's Christmas in Oz"  (2018)
 Ed, Edd n Eddy:
  "Fa, La, La, La, Ed" (Season 2, Episode 13) (2000)
  "Ed, Edd n Eddy's Jingle Jingle Jangle" (2004)
 Evil Con Carne:
  "Christmas Con Carne" (Season 1, Episode 8 Part 3) (2003)
 Foster's Home for Imaginary Friends: 
  "A Lost Claus" (Season 3, Episode 10) (2005)
 The Garfield Show:
  "Caroling Capers" (Season 1, Episode 20 Part 1) (2009)
  "Home for the Holidays" (Season 2, Episode 1) (2010)
 George of the Jungle: 
  "Jungle Bells/The Goats of Christmas Presents" (Season 1, Episode 23) (2007)
 G.I. Joe: Renegades:
  "Homecoming, Parts 1 & 2" (Season 1, Episode 11 & 12) (2010)
 The Grim Adventures of Billy & Mandy: 
  "Billy and Mandy Save Christmas" (Season 4, Episode 14) (2005)
 Hero: 108:
  "Dog Castle" (Season 1, Episode 10) (2010)
 I Am Weasel:
  "Happy Baboon Holidays" (Season 1, Episode 11) (1997)
  "IR's First Bike" (Season 5, Episode 4) (1999)
 Johnny Bravo: "'Twas the Night" (Season 1, Episode 5) (1998)
  "A Johnny Bravo Christmas" (Season 3, Episode 18) (2001)
 Justice League:
  "Comfort and Joy" (Season 2, Episode 23) (2003)
 Krypto the Superdog: 
  "Storybook Holiday" (Season 1, Episode 2) (2005) Littlest Pet Shop (2012):
  "Winter Wonder Wha…?" (Season 3, Episode 14) (2014)
  "Snow Stormin'" (Season 3, Episode 15) (2014)
 MAD: 
  "Da Grinchy Code/Duck" (Season 1, Episode 12) (2010)
  "FROST/Undercover Claus" (Season 2, Episode 15) (2011)
  "Fantastic Four Christmases/Red & White Collar" (Season 3, Episode 20) (2012)
 The Marvelous Misadventures of Flapjack: 
  "Low Tidings" (Season 2, Episode 12) (2009)
 The Mr. Men Show:
  "Snow" (Season 1, Episode 32) (2008)
 My Gym Partner's a Monkey: 
  "Have Yourself a Joyful Little Animas" (Season 2, Episode 9) (2006)OK K.O.! Let's Be Heroes: 
  "Super Black Friday" (Season 2, Episode 20) (2018)
 Pound Puppies (2010):
  "I Heard the Barks on Christmas Eve" (Season 2, Episode 13) (2012)
 Robotboy:
  "Christmas Evil" (Season 1, Episode 10b) (2005)
 Scaredy Squirrel:
  "Lumberjack Day" (Season 1, Episode 5) (2011)
 Secret Millionaires Club:
  "Just Say Snow!" (Season 1, Episode 16) (2013)
 Sheep in the Big City:
  "Home for the Baa-lidays" (Season 1, Episode 6) (2000)
 Sidekick:
  "Beneath the Missile-Toe/Ice to Know You" (Season 1, Episode 16) (2010)
 Space Ghost Coast to Coast:
  "A Space Ghost Christmas" (Season 1, Episode 12) (1994)
  "Waiting for Edward" (Season 5, Episode 11) (1998)
 Steven Universe:  
  "Winter Forecast" (Season 1, Episode 42) (2015)
  "Maximum Capacity" (Season 1, Episode 43) (2015)
  "Three Gems and a Baby" (Season 4, Episode 9) (2016)
 Steven Universe Future: 
  "Snow Day" (Season 1, Episode 7) (2019)
 Strawberry Shortcake's Berry Bitty Adventures:
  "Happy First Frost" (Season 1, Episode 19) (2010)
  "The Berry Long Winter" (Season 2, Episode 10) (2012)
  "The Big Freeze" (Season 2, Episode 11) (2012)
  "On Ice" (Season 2, Episode 12) (2012)
 ThunderCats Roar: 
  "Mandora Saves Christmas" (Season 1, Episode 52) (2020)
 The Tom and Jerry Show: 
  "The Plight Before Christmas" (Season 1, Episode 28) (2014)
  "Dragon Down the Holidays" (Season 2, Episode 15) (2017)
 Totally Spies!:
  "Evil G.L.A.D.I.S. much?" (Season 3, Episode 14) (2004)
 Ho-Ho-Ho-No!" (Season 5, Episode 23) (2010)
 Transformers: Animated:
  "Human Error, Parts 1 & 2" (Season 3, Episode 8 & 9) (2007)
 Transformers: Rescue Bots:
  "Christmas in July" (Season 1, Episode 9) (2012)
  "The Riders of Midwinter" (Season 3, Episode 9) (2014)
 Transformers: Rescue Bots Academy:
  "The Ice Wave" (Season 1, Episode 50) (2019)
 The Twisted Whiskers Show:
  "Mister Mewser's Holiday Spectacular" (Season 1, Episode 26) (2010)
 Uncle Grandpa:  "Christmas Special" (Season 1, Episode 41) (2014)
  "Secret Santa" (Season 2, Episode 23) (2015)
  "Chill Out" (Season 4, Episode 9) (2016)
 Unikitty!:  
  "No Day Like Snow Day" (Season 1, Episode 3) (2017)
  "Top of the Naughty List" (Season 1, Episode 39) (2018)
 Wacky Races (2017): 
  "It's a Wacky Life" (Season 1, Episode 18) (2017)
  "Dashing Thru the Snow" (Season 1, Episode 20) (2017)
  "Signed, Sealed, and Wacky" (Season 2, Episode 24) (2018)
 We Bare Bears: 
  "Christmas Parties" (Season 2, Episode 23) (2016)
  "The Perfect Tree" (Season 3, Episode 36) (2017)
  "Christmas Movies" (Season 4, Episode 25) (2018)

6teen
  "Deck the Mall" (Season 1, Episode 5) (2004)
  "In A Retail Wonderland" (Season 2, Episode 8) (2005)
  "Snow Job" (Season 2, Episode 27) (2006)
  "How the Rent-A-Cop Stole Christmas" (Season 3, Episode 12) (2007)

My Little Pony: Friendship Is Magic
  "Hearth's Warming Eve" (Season 2, Episode 11) (2011)
  "Hearthbreakers" (Season 5, Episode 20) (2015)
  "A Hearth's Warming Tail" (Season 6, Episode 8) (2016)
  "The Hearth's Warming Club" (Season 8, Episode 15) (2018)
  "My Little Pony: Best Gift Ever" (2018)

The Powerpuff Girls
  "Ice Sore" (Season 1, Episode 8B) (1999)
  "'Twas the Fight Before Christmas" (2003)
  "Snow Month" (Season 1, Episode 47) (2016)
  "You're a Good Man, Mojo Jojo!" (Season 2, Episode 29) (2017)
  "The Gift" (Season 3, Episode 22) (2018)

Regular Show
  "The Christmas Special" (Season 4, Episode 12) (2012)
  "New Year's Kiss" (Season 5, Episode 14) (2013)
  "White Elephant Gift Exchange" (Season 6, Episode 9) (2014)
  "Merry Christmas Mordecai" (Season 6, Episode 10) (2014)
  "Snow Tubing" (Season 7, Episode 18) (2015)
  "Christmas in Space" (Season 8, Episode 23) (2016)

Teen Titans Go!
  "Second Christmas" (Season 1, Episode 35) (2013)
  "The True Meaning of Christmas" (Season 3, Episode 19) (2015)
  "Teen Titans Save Christmas" (Season 4, Episode 6) (2016)
  "Beast Boy on a Shelf" (Season 6, Episode 3) (2019)
  "Christmas Crusaders" (Season 6, Episode 4) (2019)
  "A Holiday Story" (Season 7, Episode 32) (2021)
  "The Great Holiday Escape" (Season 8, Episode 2) (2022)

Total Drama
 Total Drama World Tour: 
 "Anything Yukon Do, I Can Do Better" (Season 3, Episode 4) (2010)
 "Slap Slap Revolution" (Season 3, Episode 7) (2010)
 "Sweden Sour" (Season 3, Episode 17) (2010)
 Total Drama: Revenge of the Island: 
 "Ice Ice Baby" (Season 4, Episode 3) (2012)
 Total DramaRama:
 "Snow Way Out" (Season 1, Episode 28)  (2018)
 "Me, My Elf, and I" (Season 2, Episode 34) (2020)
 "Snow Country for Old Men" (Season 2, Episode 37) (2020)
 "The Tree Stooges Save Christmas" (Season 3, Episode 36 & 37) (2021)

Disney Channel and Jetix and Disney XD
 The 7D:
 "Gingersnaps and Grumpy Snaps/Jollybells" (Season 1, Episode 18) (2014)
 101 Dalmatians: The Series: 
 "A Christmas Cruella" (Season 1, Episode 49) (1997)
 American Dragon: Jake Long: 
 "Hairy Christmas" (Season 2, Episode 16) (2006)
 Amphibia:
 "Froggy Little Christmas" (Season 3, Episode 9) (2021)
 Atomic Puppet:
 "Snow Maniac/Hero's Holiday" (Season 1, Episode 18) (2017)
 Big City Greens: 
 "Green Christmas" (Season 2, Episode 4) (2019)
 "Big Resolution/Winter Greens" (Season 2, Episode 23) (2021)
 "Virtually Christmas" (Season 3, Episode 29) (2022)
 Big Hero 6: The Series: 
 "The Present" (Season 2, Episode 18) (2019)
 Brandy & Mr. Whiskers: 
 "On Whiskers, On Lola, On Cheryl and Meryl" (Season 1, Episode 13) (2004)
 Buzz Lightyear of Star Command: 
 "Holiday Time" (Season 1, Episode 59) (2000)
 Counterfeit Cat:
 "Merry Christmax" (Season 1, Episode 12) (2016)
 "Low Resolutions" (Season 1, Episode 24) (2016)
 Doug: 
 "Doug's Secret Christmas" (Season 1, Episode 15) (1996)
 DuckTales (2017): 
 "Last Christmas!" (Season 2, Episode 6) (2018)
 "How Santa Stole Christmas!" (Season 3, Episode 18) (2020)
 Elena of Avalor: 
 "Navidad" (Season 1, Episode 11) (2016)
 "Snow Place Like Home" (Season 2, Episode 19) (2018)
 "Festival Of Lights" (Season 3, Episode 17) (2019)
 The Emperor's New School:
 "A Giftmas Story" (Season 2, Episode 12) (2007)
 Fish Hooks: 
 "Merry Fishmas, Milo" (Season 2, Episode 24) (2011)
 The Ghost and Molly McGee: 
 "Festival of Lights/Saving Christmas" (Season 1, Episode 10) (2021)
 "Ice Princess/Ready, Set, Snow!" (Season 1, Episode 11) (2022)
 Guardians of the Galaxy (TV series): 
 "Jingle Bell Rock" (Season 1, Episode 26) (2016)
 Hotel Transylvania: The Series:
 "The Fright Before Creepmas" (Season 1, Episode 18) (2017) 
 "A Year Without Creepmas" (Season 2, Episode 14) (2019) 
 Hulk and the Agents of S.M.A.S.H.: 
 "It's a Wonderful Smash" (Season 1, Episode 26) (2014)
 Kick Buttowski: Suburban Daredevil: 
 "A Cousin Kyle Christmas/Snow Problem" (Season 2, Episode 17) (2011)
 Kid vs. Kat: 
 "Christmas Special Part 1 & 2" (Season 1, Episode 17) (2009)
 Kim Possible:
 "A Very Possible Christmas" (Season 2, Episode 16) (2003)
 Lilo & Stitch: The Series: 
 "Topper: Experiment 025" (Season 1, Episode 21) (2003)
 Mickey Mouse:
 "Dancevidaniya" (Season 3, Episode 12) (2016)
 "Duck the Halls: A Mickey Mouse Christmas Special" (Season 3, Episode 58) (2016)
 Milo Murphy's Law:
 "A Christmas Peril" (Season 1, Episode 20) (2017)
 Pac-Man and the Ghostly Adventures:
 "Happy Holidays and a Merry Berry Day" (Season 2, Episode 13) (2014)
 "Santa-Pac" (Season 3, Episode 12) (2015)
 Packages from Planet X:
 "Christmas Evil/True North Strong & Freezing" (Season 1, Episode 17) (2013)
 Penn Zero: Part-Time Hero: 
 "North Pole Down" (Season 1, Episode 1) (2014)
 Pepper Ann: 
 "A Kosher Christmas" (Season 3, Episode 6) (1998)
 Pickle and Peanut: 
 "Springtime for Christmas/Yellow Snow/A Cabbage Day Miracle" (Season 1, Episode 10) (2015)
 Tree Lighting/A Merry Mocap Musical" (Season 2, Episode 17) (2017)
 The Proud Family:
 "Seven Days of Kwanzaa" (Season 1, Episode 11) (2001)
 Randy Cunningham: 9th Grade Ninja: 
 "Silent Punch, Deadly Punch" (Season 1, Episode 15) (2012)
 "Happy Hanukkah, Howard Weinerman/Snow Klahoma!" (Season 2, Episode 19) (2014)
 Rated A for Awesome:
 "Melting the Ice" (Season 1, Episode 4) (2011)
 "Silent Night, Awesome Night" (Season 1, Episode 36) (2011)
 The Replacements:
 "Dick Daring's All-Star Holiday Stunt Spectacular V" (Season 3, Episode 22) (2008)
 Slugterra:
  "Snowdance" (Season 2, Episode 2) (2013)
 Star vs. the Forces of Evil: 
 "Stump Day/Holiday Spellcial" (Season 3, Episode 14) (2017)
 Teamo Supremo: 
 "Happy Holidays, Mr. Gruff!" (Season 1, Episode 30) (2002)
 Ultimate Spider-Man:
 "Nightmare on Christmas" (Season 3, Episode 22) (2014)
 "The Moon Knight Before Christmas" (Season 4, Episode 24) (2016)
 Wander Over Yonder:
 "The Little Guy" (Season 1, Episode 7) (2013)
 "The Gift" (Season 1, Episode 19) (2014)
 Xiaolin Chronicles:
 "Omi Saves the Holidays" (Season 1, Episode 21) (2015)
 The ZhuZhus:
 "Zhu Years Eve" (Season 1, Episode 9) (2017)

The Disney Afternoon
 Bonkers: "Miracle at 34th Precinct" (Season 1, Episode 59) (1993)
 Darkwing Duck: "It's a Wonderful Leaf" ( Season 1, Episode 41) (1991)
 House of Mouse 
  "Pete's Christmas Caper" (Season 1, Episode 19) (2003)
  "Clarabelle's Christmas List" (Season 1, Episode 29) (2003)
 Goof Troop: "Have Yourself a Goofy Little Christmas" (1992)
 Mickey Mouse Works: "The Nutcracker" (Season 1, Episode 13) (1999)
 TaleSpin: "A Jolly Molly Christmas" (Season 1, Episode 43) (1990)
 Timon & Pumbaa: "Don't Be Elfish" (Season 3, Episode 28A) (1999)
 The Weekenders: "The Worst Holiday Ever" (Season 3, Episode 13) (2001)

Phineas and Ferb
  "S'Winter" (Season 1, Episode 3) (2008)
  "Phineas and Ferb Christmas Vacation" (Season 2, Episode 22) (2009)
  "A Phineas and Ferb Family Christmas" (Season 3, Episode 17) (2011)
  "For Your Ice Only/Happy New Year!" (Season 4, Episode 2) (2012)

Recess
  "Yes Mikey, Santa Does Shave" (Season 2, Episode 21) (1998)
 Recess Christmas: Miracle on Third Street (2001)

Teacher's Pet
 "A Dog For All Seasons" (Season 1, Episode 14) (2000)
 "The Blight Before Christmas" (Season 3, Episode 18) (2002)

Playhouse Disney/Disney Junior
 Alice's Wonderland Bakery: "The Gingerbread Palace" (Season 1, Episode 21) (2022)
 Bear in the Big Blue House: "A Berry Bear Christmas" (Season 3, Episode 25-26) (1999)
 Charlie and Lola: "How Many More Minutes Until Christmas?" (Season 2, Episode 19) (2006)
 Doc McStuffins:
 "A Very McStuffins Christmas" (Season 2, Episode 11) (2013)
 "The Doc McStuffins Christmas Special" (Season 5, Episode 3) (2018)
 The Doodlebops: "Doodlebops Holiday Show" (Season 2, Episode 1) (2006)
 Eureka!: "Jingle Bog Rock" (Season 1, Episode 20A) (2022)
 Fancy Nancy: "Nancy and the Nice List" (Season 1, Episode 16) (2018)
 Firebuds: "Hanukkah Hullabaloo/The Christmas Car-Sled Race" (Season 1, Episode 13) (2022)
 Handy Manny:
 "A Very Handy Holiday" (Season 1, Episode 15) (2006)
 "Flicker Saves Christmas" (Season 3, Episode 17) (2010) 
 "The Ayala's Christmas Extravaganza" (Season 3, Episode 18) (2010)
 Henry Hugglemonster: 
 "Happy Hugglemas" (Season 1, Episode 22) (2013)
 "Henry Hugglemonster's Very Special Hugglemas TV Special" (Season 2, Episode 22) (2015)
 Higglytown Heroes: "Twinkle's Wish" (Season 1, Episode 12) (2004)
 Jake and the Never Land Pirates: 
 "It's A Winter Never Land!/Hook on Ice!" (Season 1, Episode 24) (2011)
 "Captain Scrooge!" (Season 3, Episode 25) (2014) 
 Johnny and the Sprites: "Very Spritely Holiday/Sprites Snow Day" (Season 1, Episode 13) (2007)
 JoJo's Circus: "A Circus Town Christmas" (Season 1, Episode 18) (2003)
 Jungle Junction: "The Night Before Zipsmas/A Gift for Zooter" (Season 1, Episode 13) (2009)
 Little Einsteins: 
 "The Christmas Wish" (Season 1, Episode 15) (2005) 
 "The Wind-Up Toy Prince" (Season 2, Episode 20) (2007)Mickey and the Roadster Racers:
 "Happy Hot Diggity Holiday/Happy Holiday Helpers" (Season 1, Episode 23) (2017)
 "Snow-Go With the Flow/Happy Helpers on Ice!" (Season 2, Episode 16) (2018)
 Mickey Mouse Clubhouse: "Mickey Saves Santa" (Season 2, Episode 7) (2006)
 Miles from Tomorrowland: "Snow Globe" (Season 1, Episode 29) (2015)
 Minnie's Bow-Toons: "Oh Christmas Tree" (Season 3, Episode 5) (2013)/ "Clarabelle's Christmas Sweater" (Season 1, Episode 16) (2021)
 Muppet Babies: "A Very Muppet Babies Christmas/Summer's Super Fabulous Holiday Surprise" ( Season 1, Episode 17) (2018)
 Out of the Box: "Happy Holidays" (Season 2, Episode 26) (1999)/ "Nutcracker Sweet" (Season 3, Episode 26) (2004)
 PB&J Otter: "The Ice Moose" (Season 2, Episode 18) (1999)
 PJ Masks:
 "Gekko Saves Christmas/Gekko's Nice Ice Plan" (Season 1, Episode 12) (2015) 
 "PJ Masks Save Christmas" (Season 3, Episode 21) (2019)
 Puppy Dog Pals:
 "A Very Pug Christmas/The Latke Kerfuffle" (Season 1, Episode 25) (2017)
 "A Santa for Bob/Snowman Secret Service" (Season 2, Episode 12) (2018)
 "Elves for a Day/The Dreidel Dilemma" (Season 3, Episode 5) (2019)
 "A Christmas Mission in Toyland/Nine Lights Tonight" (Season 4, Episode 4) (2020)
 "Wrap Party Pups/Fixing Santa’s Sleigh" (Season 5, Episode 17) (2022)
 The Rocketeer (2019 TV series): "The Christmas Star" (Season 1, Episode 20) (2020)
 Rolie Polie Olie: "Jingle, Jangle Day's Eve/Snowie/Starry Starry Night" (Season 2, Episode 11) (1999)
 "A Jingle Jangle Wish" (Season 5, Episode 4C) (2001) 
 "A Little Jingle Jangle Sparkler/A Gift For Klanky Klaus/All's Squared Away Day" (Season 6, Episode 3) (2003)
 Sofia the First "Holiday in Enchancia" (Season 1, Episode 24) (2013)
 "Winter's Gift" (Season 2, Episode 20) (2014)
 "The Mystic Isles: A Very Mystic Wassalia" (Season 4, Episode 16) (2017)
 Special Agent Oso: "The Living Holiday Lights" (Season 2, Episode 11) (2010)
 Spidey and His Amazing Friends: "Merry Spidey Christmas" (Season 2, Episode 8) (2022)
 Stanley: "Little Dog Lost" (Season 1, Episode 19) (2001)
 The Lion Guard: "Timon & Pumbaa's Christmas" (Season 3, Episode 8) (2017)
 T.O.T.S.: "Santa Baby" (Season 1, Episode 18A) (2019)
 Vampirina: 
 "Nanpire and Grandpop The Greats/There's Snow Place Like Home" (Season 1, Episode 25) (2018)
 "A Gargoyle Carol" (Season 2, Episode 21) (2019)
 "The Fright Before Christmas/Scared Snowman" (Season 3, Episode 17) (2020)

Nickelodeon/Nicktoons/Nick Jr.
 Aaahh!!! Real Monsters: "Gone Shopp'n" (Season 1, Episode 6B) (1994)
 Abby Hatcher: "A Very Fuzzly Christmas" ( Season 2, Episode 17) (2020)
 Alvin and the Chipmunks: "A Very Merry Chipmunk" (Season 4, Episode 49) (2020)
 The Adventures of Jimmy Neutron: Boy Genius: "Holly Jolly Jimmy" (Season 2, Episode 8) (2003)
 All Grown Up!: "The Finster Who Stole Christmas" (Season 4, Episode 1) (2004)
 The Angry Beavers: "Gift Hoarse" (Season 1, Episode 3) (1997)
 As Told By Ginger: "An Even Steven Holiday Special" (Season 1, Episode 16) (2001)
 "Baby Shark's Big Fishmas Special" (2020)
 Back at the Barnyard: "It's an Udderful Life!" (Season 2, Episode 19) (2009)
 The Backyardigans: "The Action Elves Save Christmas Eve!" (Season 4, Episode 10) (2009)
 Blaze and the Monster Machines: "Monster Machine Christmas" (Season 2, Episode 6) (2015)
 Breadwinners: "A Crustmas Story" (Season 2, Episode 9) (2015)
 The Busy World of Richard Scarry: "Abe and Babe's Christmas Lesson/Sally Cat's Christmas Dream/The Best Christmas Present Ever" (Season 4, Episode 10) Butterbean's Cafe: "The Sugar Plum Fairy!" (Season 1, Episode 12) (2018)
 The Casagrandes: "A Very Casagrandes Christmas" (Season 2, Episode 2) (2020)
 CatDog: "A Very CatDog Christmas" (Season 2, Episode 17) (1999)
 ChalkZone: "When Santas Collide" (Season 3, Episode 15) (2004)
 Danny Phantom: "The Fright Before Christmas" (Season 2, Episode 10) (2005)
 Doug: "Doug's Christmas Story" (Season 4, Episode 10) (1993)
 Face's Music Party: "Face's SuperSnowtacular Holiday Special" (2022)
 Fanboy & Chum Chum:
 "Night Morning" (Season 1, Episode 11) (2009)
 "A Very Brrr-y Icemas" (Season 2, Episode 16) (2011)
 Franklin and Friends: "Franklin's Christmas Spirit" (Season 1, Episode 25) (2014)
 The Fresh Beat Band: "Fresh Beats in Toyland" (Season 2, Episode 7) (2010)
 Fresh Beat Band of Spies: "Christmas 2.0" (Season 1, Episode 18) (2015) 
 Go, Diego, Go!: "Diego Saves Christmas!" (Season 2, Episode 7) (2006)
 Harvey Beaks: "It's Christmas You Dorks!" (Season 2, Episode 11) (2016)
 Hey Arnold: "Arnold's Christmas" (Season 1, Episode 11) (1996)
 Invader Zim: "The Most Horrible X-Mas Ever" (Season 2, Episode 1) (2002)
 It's Pony: "Christmas with The Bramleys" (Season 1, Episode 16) (2020)
 Kappa Mikey: "A Christmas Mikey" (Season 1, Episode 19) (2006)
 Kung Fu Panda: Legends of Awesomeness: "Present Tense" (Season 2, Episode 10) (2012)
 Lego City Adventures: 
 "Police Navidad" (Season 1, Episode 17) (2019)
 " Arrest Ye Merry Gentlemen" (Season 2, Episode 10A) (2020)
 Little Bear: 
 "The Snowball Fight/Winter Solstice/Snowbound" (Season 2, Episode 5) (1996) 
 "Gingerbread Cookies (Season 3, Episode 6A) (1997)
 "Winter Wonderland" (Season 3, Episode 13B) (1998)
 Little Bill: "Merry Christmas Little Bill" (Season 2, Episode 22) (2001)
 Little Charmers: "Santa Sparkle" (Season 1, Episode 30) (2015)
 Maisy: "Snow/Cards/Christmas Tree/Christmas" (Season 1, Episode 17) (1999)
 My Life as a Teenage Robot: "A Robot for All Seasons" (Season 2, Episode 1) (2004)
 Nella the Princess Knight: "The Knight Before Christmas" (Season 1, Episode 23) (2017)
 NFL Rush Zone:
 "Frost and Ten" (Season 2, Episode 5) (2012)
 "Gone Viral" (Season 3, Episode 5) (2013)
 The Patrick Star Show: "Just in Time for Christmas" (Season 1, Episode 10A) (2021)
 The Penguins of Madagascar: "The All Nighter Before Christmas" (Season 2, Episode 31) (2010)
 Pig Goat Banana Cricket: "Happy Chalawunga" (Season 1, Episode 15) (2015)
 Rainbow Butterfly Unicorn Kitty: "Merry Mythmas" (Season 1, Episode 26) (2019)
 Robot and Monster: "Baconmas" (Season 1, Episode 22) (2012)
 Rocket Power: "A Rocket Xmas" (Season 4, Episode 2) (2003)
 Rocko's Modern Life: "Rocko's Modern Christmas" (Season 2, Episode 6) (1994)
 Sanjay and Craig: "Huggle Day" (Season 3, Episode 5) (2015)
 Santiago of the Seas: A Pirate Christmas (2020)
 Shimmer and Shine: "Santa's Little Genies" (Season 1, Episode 6) (2015)
 Sunny Day: "Best Christmas Ever!" (Season 1, Episode 16) (2017)
 Team Umizoomi: "Santa's Little Fixers" (Season 2, Episode 4) (2010)
 The Wild Thornberrys: "Have Yourself a Very Thornberry Little Christmas" (Season 2, Episode 21) (1999)
 T.U.F.F. Puppy: A Doomed Christmas (Season 1, Episode 20) (2011)
 Wayside:
 "Christmas" (Season 2, Episode 6B) (2007)
 Wallykazam!:
 "Wally Saves the Trollidays" (Season 1, Episode 21) (2014)
 Wild Grinders:
 "Grinder Claus/Merry Grindernukamas" (Season 1, Episode 24) (2012)
 "Grindy the Snowman" (Season 2, Episode 23) (2014)

Blue's Clues
 "A Snowy Day" (Season 1, Episode 9) (1996)
 "Blue's Big Holiday" (Season 3, Episode 22) (1999)
 "Blue's First Holiday" (Season 5, Episode 29) (2003)

Blue's Clues & You!
  "Blue's Night Before Christmas" (Season 2, Episode 8) (2020)
  "A Blue's Clues Festival of Lights" (Season 3, Episode 4) (2021)
  "Blue's Snowy Day Surprise" (Season 3, Episode 5) (2021)
  "A Blue Christmas with You!" (Season 4, Episode 6) (2022)

Bubble Guppies
  "Happy Holidays, Mr. Grumpfish!" (Season 2, Episode 2) (2011)
  "A Very Guppy Christmas" (Season 3, Episode 20) (2014)
  "The Guppies Save Christmas!" (Season 5, Episode 14) (2020)
  "Christmas is Coming!" (Season 6, Episode 3) (2021)

Dora the Explorer
  "A Present For Santa" (Season 2, Episode 15) (2002)
  "Dora's Christmas Carol Adventure" (Season 5, Episode 14) (2009)

The Fairly OddParents
  "Christmas Every Day" (Season 1, Episode 7) (2001)
  "Merry Wishmas" (Season 6, Episode 12) (2008)

Franklin
  "Franklin's School Play" (Season 1, Episode 9A) (1997)
  "Franklin's Christmas Gift" (Season 1, Episode 12A) (1998)
 Franklin's Magic Christmas (2001)

Max & Ruby
  "Max's Christmas/Ruby’s Snow Queen/Max’s Rocket Run" (Season 1, Episode 10) (2002)
  "Grandma's Present/Max and Ruby's Christmas Tree/Max's Snowplow" (Season 3, Episode 13) (2007)
  "Ruby's Gingerbread House/Max's Christmas Passed/Max's New Year" (Season 4, Episode 8) (2009)
  "Ruby's Perfect Christmas Tree/Max's Christmas Present/Max and Ruby's Christmas Carol" (Season 5, Episode 1) (2011)
  "Max Decorates" (Season 6, Episode 16A) (2017)
  "Let it Snow" (Season 7, Episode 10B) (2018)

PAW Patrol
  "Pups Save Christmas" (Season 1, Episode 11) (2013)
  "Pups Save a Bah Humdinger" (Season 7, Episode 16) (2020)
 Dino Rescue: Pups Save a Dino Christmas (Season 1, Episode 9) (2020)

The Ren & Stimpy Show
  "Son of Stimpy" (Season 2, Episode  7) (1993)
  "A Scooter for Yaksmas" (Season 5, Episode 9) (1996)

Rugrats/Rugrats (2021 TV series)
  "The Santa Experience" (Season 2, Episode 14) (1992)
  "The Blizzard" (Season 3, Episode 12B) (1993)
  "A Rugrats Chanukah" (Season 4, Episode 1) (1996)
  "Let it Snow" (Season 4, Episode 14B) (1997)
  "A Rugrats Kwanzaa" (Season 7, Episode 13) (2001)
  "Babies in Toyland" (Season 9, Episode 3-4) (2002)
  "Traditions" (Season 1, Episode 14) (2021)

SpongeBob SquarePants
 "Christmas Who?" (Season 2, Episode 8) (2000)
 "Survival of the Idiots" (Season 2, Episode 9A) (2001)
 "The Secret Box" (Season 2, Episode 15A) (2001)
 "Snowball Effect" (Season 3, Episode 6A) (2002)
 "Frozen Face-Off" (Season 8, Episode 4)  (2011)
 "It's a SpongeBob Christmas!" (Season 8, Episode 23) (2012)
 "Goons on the Moon" (Season 11, Episode 26) (2018)
 "Plankton's Old Chum" (Season 12, Episode 11A) (2019)
 "SpongeBob's Road to Christmas" (Season 13, Episode 5) (2021)

The Loud House
 "Snow Bored" (Season 1, Episode 24B) (2016)
 "11 Louds a Leapin" (Season 2, Episode 1) (2016)
 "Snow Way Out/Snow Way Down (Season 2, Episode 26) (2017)
 "Season's Cheating/A Flipmas Carol" (Season 5, Episode 8A) (2020)
 "Snow Escape/Snow News Day" (Season 6, Episode 23) (2022)

Wow! Wow! Wubbzy!
 "O' Figgity Fig Tree/Snow Day" (Season 1, Episode 22) (2007)
 "Great and Grumpy Holiday/The Super Special Gift" (Season 2, Episode 10)  (2008)

Weekday and Saturday Morning cartoons
 G.I. Joe: A Real American Hero: "COBRA Claws Are Coming to Town" (Season 3, Episode 39) (1985)
 Count Duckula: "A Christmas Quacker" (Season 3, Episode 10) (1990)
 Biker Mice from Mars: "Chill Zone" (Season 1, Episode 12) (1994)
 Heathcliff: "Christmas Memories" (Season 2, Episode 9B) (1985), "North Pole Cat" (Season 2, Episode 21A) (1985)
 Inspector Gadget: Inspector Gadget Saves Christmas (1992)
 Kate & Mim-Mim: 
 "A Christmas Wish" (Season 1, Episode 26) (2014)
 Tatu: 
 Imperfect Girl (2000)
 Pucca: 
 "'Tis the Season for REVENGE!/Northern Lights Out/Secret Santa" (Season 1, Episode 10) (2006)
 RoboCop: Alpha Commando:
 "Oh Tannenbaum, Whoa Tannenbaum!" (Season 1, Episode 18) (1998)
 Robotech:
 "Season's Greetings" (Season 1, Episode 35) (1985)
 Sabrina: The Animated Series:
 "Witchmas Carole" (Season 1, Episode 58) (1999)
 Samurai Pizza Cats: "The Cheese who Stole Christmas" (Season 1, Episode 47) (1993)
 The Spectacular Spider-Man: "Reinforcement" (Season 2, Episode 3) (2009)
 Teenage Mutant Ninja Turtles: "The Christmas Aliens" (a. k. a. "Michelangelo's Christmas Rescue) (Season 3, Episode 12)  (2004) 
 Thugaboo: Christmas Special (2006)

ABC
 Bump in the Night: "'Twas the Night Before Bumpy" (1995)
 Dumb and Dumber: "Santa Klutz" (1995)
 Pac-Man: "Christmas Comes to Pac-Land" (1982)
 The Real Ghostbusters: "X-Mas Marks the Spot" (Season 1, Episode 13) (1986)

CBS
 Ace Ventura: Pet Detective: The Reindeer Hunter" (Season 1, Episode 1) (1995)
 Famous Classic Tales: "A Christmas Carol" (Season 1, Episode 3) (1970)
 The Fat Albert "Christmas Special" (1977)
 A Garfield Christmas Special (1987)
 Garfield and Friends: "Heatwave Holiday" (Season 2, Episode 4C) (1989)
 The Little Rascals: The Little Rascals Christmas Special (1979)
 The Mask: "Santa Mask" (Season 1, Episode 14) (1995)
 Tennessee Tuxedo and His Tales: "Tree Trimmers" (Season 3, Episode 9) (1965)
 The Tom and Jerry Comedy Show: Snowbrawl" (Season 1, Episode 22) (1980)

Fox
 Bobby's World: "Miracle on 34th Street & Rural Route 1" (Season 6, Episode 5) (1995)
 Eek! The Cat:
 It's a Wonderful Nine Lives" (Season 1, Episode 12) (1992)
 It's a Very Merry Eek's-Mas (Season 2, Episode 9)(1993)
 Life with Louie: "A Christmas Surprise for Mrs. Stillman" (Season 1, Episode 1) (1994)
 Family Portrait" (Season 3, Episode 10) (1997)
 The New Woody Woodpecker Show: "A Very Woody Christmas/It's A Chilly Christmas After All/Yule Get Yours" (Season 1, Episode 23) (1999)
 "The Twelve Lies of Christmas" (Season 2, Episode 17) (2000)
 Peter Pan and the Pirates: "Hook's Christmas" (Season 1, Episode 37) (1991)
 The Spooktacular New Adventures of Casper: "A Christmas Peril/Ms. Banshee's Holiday Hits/Good Morning, Dr. Harvey/Fright Before Christmas (Season 2, Episode 13) (1996)
 Super Dave: Daredevil for Hire: Merry Christmas, Super Dave!" (Season 1, Episode 12) (1992)
 The Tick: "The Tick Loves Santa!" (Season 2, Episode 10) (1995)
 Where on Earth Is Carmen Sandiego?: "Just Like Old Times" (Season 3, Episode 10) (1995)
 Winx Club: "A Magix Christmas" (Season 5, Episode 10) (2012)
 X-Men: "Have Yourself a Morlock Little X-Mas" (Season 4, Episode 17) (1995)

NBC
 Alvin and the Chipmunks: 
 A Chipmunk Christmas (1981)
 "Swiss Family Chipmunks/Santa Harry" (Season 1, Episode 11) (1983)
 Merry Christmas, Mr. Carroll" ( Season 7, Episode 13) (1989)
 The Berenstain Bears' Christmas Tree (1979)
 The Bullwinkle Show: "Topsy Turvy World" (Season 3, Episode 27-33) (1962)
 Camp Candy: "Christmas in July" (Season 1, Episode 13) (1990)
 The Space Kidettes: "The Flight Before Christmas" (Season 1, Episode 11) (1966)

PBS Kids
 Alma's Way:
 "Alma on Ice" (Season 1, Episode 8B) (2021)
 Alma's Nochebuena" (Season 1, Episode 14A) (2021)
 Arthur: Arthur's Perfect Christmas (2000)
 Angelina Ballerina: 
 "The Gift" (Season 1, Episode 2A) (2002)
 Christmas in Mouseland (2002)
 Angelina Ballerina: The Next Steps: "Angelina's Holiday Treats" (Season 2, Episode 2A) (2009)
 Barney and the Backyard Gang: Waiting for Santa (1990)
 Barney & Friends:
 Barney's Night Before Christmas (1999)
 "Barney's Christmas Star" (2002)
 "Gift of the Dinos/A Visit to Santa" (Season 11, Episode 19) (2007) 
 "A Very Merry Christmas" (2011)
 Biz Kid$: A Biz Kid$ Christmas Special (2007)
 Caillou Caillou's Holiday Movie (2003)
 "Caillou's Christmas" (Season 4, Episode 17) (2007)
 The Cat in the Hat Knows a Lot About Christmas! (2012)
 Clifford's Puppy Days "The Big, Big Present/Hanukah Plunder Blunder" (Season 2, Episode 7) (2005)
 Heroes and Friends/The Cookie Crumbles (Season 2 Episode 12) (2006)
 Curious George: A Very Monkey Christmas (2009)
 Cyberchase:
 "Starlight Night" (Season 3, episode 12) (2004) 
 "When Penguins Fly" (Season 6, episode 2) (2007)
 "A Reboot Eve to Remember" (Season 11, episode 5) (2017)
 Daniel Tiger's Neighborhood: 
 "Snowflake Day!" (Season 1, Episode 33) (2013)
 "Daniel's Winter Adventure/Neighborhood Nutcracker" (Season 2, Episode 7) (2014)
 Dinosaur Train:
 "Dinosaurs in the Snow/Cretaceous Conifers" (Season 1, Episode 17) (2009)
 "Don's Winter Wish/Festival of Lights" (Season 2, Episode 12) (2012)
 Elinor Wonders Why: 
 "The Science of Staying Warm" (Season 1, Episode 4A) (2020)
 "Snow Friend" (Season 1, Episode 11B) (2020)
 Jay Jay the Jet Plane: "Jay Jay's Christmas Adventure" (Season 1, Episode 35-36) (1998)
 Let's Go Luna!: "Luna's Christmas Around The World!" (2018)
 Liberty's Kids: "Across the Delaware" (Season 1, Episode 19) (2002)
 Martha Speaks: "Martha's Holiday Surprise" (Season 6, Episode 8) (2014)
 Maya & Miguel: "Miguel's Wonderful Life" (Season 4, Episode 3) (2005)
 Molly of Denali: "Tooey's Hole-liday Sweater" (Season 1, Episode 32B) (2020)
 Nature Cat: "A Nature Carol" (2019)
 Odd Squad: Reindeer Games" (Season 1, Episode 5) (2014)
 Peg + Cat:
 "The Hanukkah Problem" (Season 1, Episode 28B) "The Christmas Problem" (Season 1, Episode 29) (2014)
 Pinkalicious & Peterrific: "Gingerbread House/Christmas Tree Trouble" (Season 2, Episode 13) (2020)
 Ready Jet Go!: "Holidays in Boxwood Terrace" (Season 1, Episode 38) (2017)
 Sid the Science Kid: "Sid's Holiday Adventure" (Season 1, Episode 38) (2009)
 Sesame Street: 
 Christmas Eve on Sesame Street (1978)
 Elmo Saves Christmas (1996)
 Elmo's World: Happy Holidays! (2002)
 Elmo's Christmas Countdown (2007)
 Once Upon a Sesame Street Christmas (2016)
 "Holiday at Hooper's" (Season 51, Episode 6) (2022)
 Splash and Bubbles: "Whitebeard/Coral Day" (Season 1, Episode 31) (2017)
 Super Why: 
 "Twas the Night Before Christmas" (Season 1, Episode 38) (2008)
 "The Nutcracker" (Season 1, Episode 56) (2009)
 Judith's Happy Chanukah" (Season 3, Episode 10) (2015)
 Teletubbies:
 "Christmas Tree" (Season 1, Episode 111)(1997) 
 "Making Christmas Cards" (Season 1, Episode 112) (1997)
 "Crackers" (Season 1, Episode 113) (1997)
 "Christmas Carols" (Season 1, Episode 114) (1997)
 "Snowy Story" (Season 1, Episode 115) (1997) 
 "Christmas in South Africa" (Season 2, Episode 118) (1998)
 "Christmas in Finland" (Season 2, Episode 119) (1998)
 "Christmas in UK" (Season 2, Episode 120) (1998)
 "Christmas in Spain" (Season 2, Episode 121) (1998) "Nativity Play" (Season 2, Episode 122) (1998) 
 The Magic School Bus: "Holiday Special" (Season 3, Episode 13) (1996)
 Wild Kratts: "A Creature Christmas" (Season 4, Episode 5) (2015)
 WordGirl: "Oh Holiday Cheese" (Season 2, Episode 19) (2009)
 WordWorld: "The Christmas Star/A Christmas Present For Dog" (Season 1, Episode 26) (2008)

Universal Kids/Sprout
 "A Sesame Street Christmas Carol" (2006)
 Dot.:
 "A Song for Everyone" (Season 1, Episode 13) (2016)
 "The Holiday Tree" (Season 1, Episode 14) (2016)
 Justin Time:
 "Yodel Odel Day" (Season 1, Episode 2A) (2011)
 "Babushka's Bear" (Season 3, Episode 8) (2016)
 Nina's World:
 "Nina's Very Merry Gift" (Season 1, Episode 31)  (2016)
 "Terrific Trucks Save Christmas" (2016)
 Where's Waldo:
 "A Wanderer Christmas" (Season 1, Episode 20) (2019)

Hanna-Barbera / Warner Bros. Animation / Kids' WB
 Batman: The Animated Series: Christmas With The Joker (1992)
 Batman: The Brave and the Bold: "Invasion of the Secret Santas!" (Season 1, Episode 4) (2008)
 Dorothy and the Wizard of Oz: "Dorothy's Christmas in Oz" (2018)
 Earthworm Jim: "For Whom The Jingle Bells Tolls" (Season 2, Episode 10) (1996)
 Freakazoid: "The Chip (Part 1)" (Season 1, Episode 6)/"The Chip (Part 2)" (Season 1, Episode 7A)/"In Arms Way" (Season 1, Episode 10A) (1995)
 Histeria: "The American Revolution (Part 1)" (Season 1, Episode 5) (1998)
 Jackie Chan Adventures: "A Jolly J-Team Xmas" (Season 3 Episode 10) (2002)
 Jellystone!: "Jailcation" (Season 1, Episode 36) (2022)
 The Jetsons: "A Jetson Christmas Carol" (Season 2, Episode 36) (1985)
 Justice League: "Comfort And Joy" (Season 2, Episode 23) (2003)
 Krypto the Superdog: "Storybook Holiday" (Season 1, Episode 26) (2005)
 MAD:
 "Da Grinchy Code/Duck" (Season 1, Episode 12) (2010)
 "FROST/Undercover Claus (Season 2, Episode 15) (2011)
 "Fantastic Four Christmases/Red & White Collar" (Season 3, Episode 20) (2012)
 Men in Black: The Series: "The Black Christmas Syndrome" (Season 2, Episode 10) (1998)
 Mucha Lucha: "The Match Before Xmas" (Season 3, Episode 9) (2004)
 Static Shock: "Frozen Out" (Season 2, Episode 5) (2002)
 The New Batman Adventures: "Holiday Knights" (Season 1, Episode 1) (1997)
 ThunderCats Roar: "Mandora Saves Christmas" (Season 1, Episode 52) (2020)
 The Tom and Jerry Show: 
 "The Plight Before Christmas" (Season 1, Episode 28) (2014)
 "Dragon Down the Holidays" (Season 2, Episode 15) (2017)
 Tom and Jerry Tales: "Ho Ho Horrors" (Season 1, Episode 22) (2007) Unikitty!: 
 "No Day Like Snow Day" (Season 1, Episode 3) (2017)
 "Top of the Naughty List" (Season 1, Episode 39) (2018)
 Wacky Races:
 "It's a Wacky Life" (Season 1, Episode 18) (2017)
 "Dashing Thru the Snow" (Season 1, Episode 20) (2017)
 Signed, Sealed, and Wacky" (Season 2, Episode 24) (2018)
 X-Men: Evolution: "On Angel's Wings" (Season Two, Episode 7) * (2001)

Animaniacs
 Animaniacs "Twas The Day Before Christmas/Jingle Boo/The Great Wakkorotti: The Holiday Concert/A Christmas Plotz/Little Drummer Warners" (Season 1, Episodes 49 & 50) (1993)
 "The Twelve Days of Christmas" (Season 3, Episode 10D) (1996)
 "Noel" (Season 4, Episode 2C) (1996)
 "The Christmas Tree" (Season 5, Episode 8A) (1997)
 Pinky and the Brain: "A Pinky and the Brain Christmas" (Season 1, Episode 8) (1995)
 Pinky, Elmyra and the Brain: "Yule Be Sorry" (Season 1, Episode 7A) (1998)
 Animaniacs (2020): "How the Brain Thieved Christmas, Part 1 & 2/Santamaniacs" (Season 3, Episode 9) (2023)

The Flintstones
 "Christmas Flintstone" (Season 5, Episode 15) (1964/ABC)
 A Flintstone Christmas (1977/NBC)
 A Flintstone Family Christmas (1993/ABC)
 A Flintstones Christmas Carol (1994/ABC)

Looney Tunes
 Tiny Toon Adventures: "It's A Wonderful Tiny Toons Christmas Special" (Season 3, Episode 20) (1992)
 Taz-Mania: "No Time For Christmas" (Season 3, Episode 13) (1993)
 The Sylvester & Tweety Mysteries: 
 "It Happened One Night Before Christmas" (Season 1, Episode 10) (1995)
 "Feather Christmas/A Fist Full of Lutefisk" (Season 4, Episode 41B) (1998)Baby Looney Tunes: "Christmas In July" (Season 1, Episode 12b) (2002)
 The Looney Tunes Show: "A Christmas Carol" (Season 2, Episode 10) (2012)
 New Looney Tunes: 
 "Tis the Seasoning/Winter Blunderland" (Season 1, Episode 44) (2017)
 "The Legend of Burrito Monday" (Season 3, Episode 52) (2020)
 Looney Tunes Cartoons: "Bugs Bunny's 24-Carrot Holiday Special" (2020)
 Bugs Bunny Builders: "Looneyburg Lights" (Season 1, Episode 19/20) (2022)

Scooby-Doo
 The New Scooby-Doo Mysteries: "The Nutcracker Scoob" (Season 1, Episode 13) (1984)
 What's New, Scooby-Doo?: A Scooby-Doo Christmas" (Season 1, Episode 10) (2002)
 Scooby-Doo! Haunted Holidays (2012)
 Be Cool, Scooby-Doo!  "Scary Christmas" (Season 1, Episode 14) (2015)
 "Scroogey Doo" (Season 2, Episode 10) (2017)

The Smurfs
 "The Baby's First Christmas" (Season 3, Episode 42) (1983)
 The Magic Sack of Mr. Nicholas" (Season 7, Episode 25A) (1987)
 "Tis The Season To Be Smurfy" (1987)

Other Animations

Angry Birds
Angry birds classic & series
 Angry Birds Toons "Jingle Yells" (Season 1, Episode 40) (2013)
 "Joy to the Pigs" (Season 2, Episode 10) (2014)
 "Last Tree Standing" (Season 3, Episode 11) (2015)
 Piggy Tales "Snowed Up" (Season 1, Episode 28) (2014)
 "Light Dance" (Season 3, Episode 24) (2016)
 "Pig Expectations" (Season 3, Episode 25) (2016)
 "Gift Wrapped" (Season 3, Episode 26) (2016)
 "Holiday Song" (Season 3, Episode 27) (2016)
 "Holiday Heist" (Season 4, Episode 2) (2017)
 "Joyful Jingle" (Season 4, Episode 16) (2017)
 Happy New Pig (Season 4, Episode 24) (2017)
 Angry Birds: Summer Madness Pigmas" (Season 3, Episode 4) (2022)

GoGoRiki"Snow Daze" (Season 1, Episode 12A) (2008)"Operation Santa Claus" (Season 1, Episode 12B) (2008)"Happy New Year" (Season 1, Episode 12C) (2008)

Anime
 Astro Boy: "The Light Ray Robot" (Season 1, Episode 13) Bobobo-bo Bo-bobo: "Let's Get Wiggy With It" (Season 1, Episode 2) (2005)
 Cyborg 009: "Christmas Eve Mirage" (Season 1, Episode 11) Digimon: Digital Monsters "A Very Digi Christmas (Season 2, Episode 38) (2001)
 Dinosaur King: "Santa Saurus!" (Season 1, Episode 45) (2007)
 Flint the Time Detective: "Cavemen's Christmas" (Season 1, Episode 13) Hamtaro: "Merry Christmas!" (Season 1, Episode 25) (2000)
 "It's Santa, Merry Christmas" (Season 9 Episode 26) (2004)
 "A Christmas Ride!" (Season 11, Episode 26) (2005)
 Love Hina: "Love Hina Christmas Special - Silent Eve" (2000)
 Ranma ½: "Tendo Family Christmas Scramble"(1993)
 Sgt. Frog: The Space Frog Who Stole Christmas!"(Season 1, Episode 39) Yo-Kai Watch: "A Very Christmas/The Koma-Santa Clause/Yo-Kai Ol' Saint Trick" (Season 2, Episode 24) (2016)
 "Christmas Blackout!; Time for a Yo-kai Watch Upgrade" (Season 3, Episode 18) (2018)

Nintendo
 Donkey Kong Country: The Kongo Bongo Festival of Lights (1999)
 The Super Mario Bros. Super Show!: Koopa Klaus (1989)
 The Super Mario Bros. Super Show!: Santa Claus is Coming to Flatbush (1989)
 Super Mario World: The Night Before Cave Christmas (1991)

Pokémon
 "Holiday Hi-Jynx" (Season 2, Episode 65) (1998)
 "Pikachu's Winter Vacations: Christmas Night" (1999)
 "Pikachu's Winter Vacations: Stantler's Little Helpers" (2000)
 "Pikachu's Winter Vacations: Delibird's Dilemma" (2001)
 "Pikachu's Winter Vacations: Snorlax Snowman" (2001)

 Adventures of Sonic the Hedgehog 
 Sonic Christmas Blast (1996)

Disney Sing-Along Songs
 Very Merry Christmas Songs (1988/2002)
 The 12 Days of Christmas (1993)

Pippi Longstocking"Pippi's Christmas" (Season 1, Episode 14) (1998)

VeggieTales"The Toy That Saved Christmas" (1996)"The Star of Christmas" (2002)"Saint Nicholas: A Story of Joyful Giving" (2009)"It's a Meaningful Life" (2010)"The Little Drummer Boy (2011)Merry Larry and the True Light of Christmas" (2013)

VeggieTales in the City"An Ichabeezer Christmas/A Christmas Play" (Season 2, Episode 6) (2017)

The VeggieTales Show"The Best Christmas Gift" (Season 1, Episode 1) (2019)

Netflix
 Action Pack:
 "The Action Pack Saves Christmas" (2022)
 Angry Birds: Summer Madness: 
 "Pigmas" (Season 3, Episode 4) (2022)
 A StoryBots Christmas (2017)
 Beat Bugs:
 "Christmas Time Is Here Again" (Season 2, Episode 5) (2016)
 The Boss Baby: Christmas Bonus (2022)
 Chico Bon Bon: Monkey with a Tool Belt:
 "Chico Bon Bon and the Very Berry Holiday" (2020)
 The Creature Cases:
 "The Missing Mammoth: A Holiday Mystery" (2022)
 Cupcake & Dino: General Services:
 "Christmas is Cancelled/Ice Station Dino" (Season 1, Episode 13) (2018)
 The Cuphead Show!:
 "Holiday Tree-dition" (Season 3, Episode 5) (2022)
 "A Very Devil Christmas" (Season 3, Episode 6) (2022)
 Dead End: Paranormal Park:
 "The Nightmare Before Christmas in July (Season 1, Episode 5)" (2022)
 DreamWorks Dragons: Rescue Riders:
 "Huttsgalor Holiday" (2020)
 The Epic Tales of Captain Underpants:
 "Mega Blissmas" (2020)
 Gabby's Dollhouse:
 "A CAT-Tabulous Christmas" (Season 6, Episode 1) (2022)
 Go, Dog. Go!:
 "Snow Dog, Snow" (Season 2, Episode 1) (2021)
 Go! Go! Cory Carson:
 "A Go! Go! Cory Carson Christmas" (2020)
 Harvey Girls Forever!:
 "Miracle on Harvey Street/I Know What You Did Last Stu-mmer" (Season 4, Episode 2) (2020) 
 Hilda:
 "Chapter 10: The Yule Lads" (Season 2, Episode 10) (2020)
 Home "Home for the Holidays" (2017)
 Inspector Gadget (2015):
 "The Claw Who Stole Christmas/The Thingy" (Season 2, Episode 15)  (2018)
 Johnny Test:
 "Johnny's Holiday Light Fight" (Season 1, Episode 20) (2021)
 Llama Llama:
 "Snow Show/Secret Santa" (Season 1, Episode 6) (2018)
 Mighty Express:
 "A Mighty Christmas" (2020)
 Miraculous Ladybug: 
 "A Special Christmas/Santa Claws (Season 2, Episode 1) (2016)
 Christmaster" (Season 3, Episode 24) (2019)
 The Mr. Peabody & Sherman Show:
 "Charles Dickens" (Season 2, Episode 10B) (2016)
 "Robert Edwin Peary" (Season 3, Episode 10B) (2016)
 My Little Pony: Make Your Mark:
 "Winter Wishday" (Season 1, Episode 10) (2022)
 Spirit Riding Free: 
 "Lucky and the Christmas Spirit" (Season 2, Episode 5) (2017)
 "Spirit of Christmas" (2019)
 Super Monsters: 
 "Super Monsters and the Wish Star" (2018)
 "Super Monsters Save Christmas" (2019)
 "Santa's Super Monster Helpers" (2020)
 Team Zenko Go:
 "Harmony Harbor Holiday Surprise" (Season 2, Episode 5) (2022)
 Trash Truck:
 "A Trash Truck Christmas" (2020)
 Trolls: The Beat Goes On!:
 "Snow Day" (Season 5, Episode 5A) (2019)
 True and the Rainbow Kingdom:
 "TRUE: Winter Wishes" (Season 4, Episode 6-7) (2019)
 Wonderoos: Holiday Holiday! (2020)

Amazon Prime
 Click, Clack, Moo: "Christmas at the Farm" (2017)
 Costume Quest: "Heroes on Holiday" (Season 1, Episode 14) (2019)
 Creative Galaxy: "Baby Georgia's First Christmas/Christmas Memories" (Season 1, Episode 13) (2014)
 If You Give a Mouse a Cookie: "If You Give a Mouse a Christmas Cookie" (2016)
 Pete the Cat: "A Very Groovy Christmas" (Season 1, Episode 3) (2018)
 The Snowy Day Wishenpoof: "A Wish World Christmas" (Season 2, Episode 12–13) (2017)

Peacock
 Madagascar: A Little Wild: Holiday Goose Chase (2021)

Apple TV+
 Doug Unplugs: Botty Holidays" (Season 2, Episode 7) (2021)
 Get Rolling with Otis: "A Winter’s Cow Tale" (Season 1, Episode 9) (2021)
 Interrupting Chicken: "A Chicken Carol" (Season 1, Episode 9) (2022)
 Pinecone & Pony: "Festival of Might" (Season 2, Episode 6A (2023)
 Pretzel and the Puppies: "Merry Muttgomery!" (Season 1, Episode 9) (2022)
 The Snoopy Show:
 "Happiness Is a Snow Day" (Season 1, Episode 4) (2021)
 "Happiness Is the Gift of Giving" (Season 2, Episode 13) (2022)
 Stillwater: The Way Home" (Season 1, Episode 13) (2021)

Celebrity-hosted variety shows

The Jack Benny Program
 The Jack Benny Program: "Jack Does Christmas Shopping" (Season 5, Episode 6) (1954)
 The Jack Benny Program: "Christmas Shopping Show" (Season 8, Episode 7) (1957)
 The Jack Benny Program: "Christmas Gift Exchange" (Season 9, Episode 8) (1958)
 The Jack Benny Program: "Christmas Show" (Season 11, Episode 9) (1960)
 The Jack Benny Program: "Christmas Party" (Season 12, Episode 10) (1961)

Perry Como
 The Perry Como Chesterfield Supper Club ~ Christmas Special (1948, 1949)
 The Perry Como Chesterfield Show ~ Christmas Special (1950–1954)
 The Perry Como Show ~ Christmas Special (1955–1958)
 Perry Como's Kraft Music Hall ~ Christmas Special (1959–1962, 1965, 1966)
 Perry Como's Kraft Music Hall ~ Perry Como's Christmas In Rome (1964)
 Perry Como: Christmas in the Holy Land (1980)

The Jackie Gleason Show
 "Cavalcade of Stars: Christmas Party" (Season 3, Episode 17) (1951)
 The Jackie Gleason Show: "Christmas Party" (Season 1, Episode 13) (1952)
 The Jackie Gleason Show: Santa and the Bookies" (Season 2, Episode 10) (1953)
 The Jackie Gleason Show: Christmas Party (1953)
 The Jackie Gleason Show: Santa and the Bookies (1954)
 The Jackie Gleason Show: The Poor Soul in Christmas-Land (1956)
 The Jackie Gleason Show: Run, Santa, Run (1966)
 The Jackie Gleason Show: The Poor Soul in Christmas-Land (1966)

The Danny Kaye Show
 The Danny Kaye Show: Christmas Show (1964)
 The Danny Kaye Show: Christmas Show (1965)
 The Danny Kaye Show: Christmas Show (1966)

David Letterman
 Late Night with David Letterman: Christmas with the Lettermans (1984)
 Late Night with David Letterman: Christmas with the Lettermans (1986)
 Late Night with David Letterman: Dave Letterman's Old-Fashioned Christmas (1987)

Dean Martin
 The Dean Martin Show: Christmas with the Martins and Sinatras (1967)
 The Dean Martin Show: Christmas Show (1968)
 The Dean Martin Show: Christmas Show (1972)
 Dean Martin's California Christmas (1975)
 Dean Martin's Christmas in California (1977, 1979)
 Dean Martin Christmas Special (1980)
 Dean Martin's Christmas at Sea World (1981)

The Osmonds
 Donny & Marie: Christmas Show (1976–1978)

Frank Sinatra
 The Frank Sinatra Show (1950): Christmas Show (1950)
 The Frank Sinatra Show (1957): Happy Holidays with Bing and Frank (1957)

Red Skelton
 The Red Skelton Show: The Cop and the Anthem (1955)
 The Red Skelton Show: Freddie and the Yuletide Doll (1961, restaged 1962)
 The Red Skelton Show: The Plight Before Christmas (1964, restaged 1965)
 The Red Skelton Show: Christmas Show (1966)
 The Red Skelton Show: A Christmas Urchin (1967)
 The Red Skelton Show: Christmas Show (1970)
 Freddie the Freeloader's Christmas Dinner'' (1981)

The Andy Williams Show
Williams hosted a Christmas-themed episode annually.

See also
 Christmas in the media
 List of Christmas television specials
 List of A Christmas Carol adaptations
 List of Christmas films
 List of United States Christmas television specials
 Christmas music
 List of Halloween television specials
 List of Thanksgiving television specials
 List of Easter television specials
 List of St. Patrick's Day television specials
 List of Valentine's Day television specials

References

Christmas television
≠
United States television